= List of Intelsat satellites =

This is a list of satellites operated by Intelsat Corporation.

== Intelsat brand ==
=== Generations 1-4 (1965–1978) ===
Satellite	Launch (UTC)	Rocket	Launch site	Longitude	Fate	Out of Service	Remarks
==== First generation ====
Intelsat I F-1 (Early Bird)	6 April 1965; 23:47:50	Delta D	Cape Canaveral, LC-17A	28.0° W	Retired	August 1965	First commercial geosynchronous satellite
Intelsat I F-2	Not launched						
==== Second generation ====
Intelsat II F-1	26 October 1966; 23:05:00	Delta E1	Cape Canaveral, LC-17B	—N/a	Retired	—N/a	Apogee motor failed, but satellite operated from geostationary transfer orbit (GTO).
Intelsat II F-2	11 January 1967; 10:55:00	Delta E1	Cape Canaveral, LC-17B		Retired	1969	
Intelsat II F-3	23 March 1967; 01:30:12	Delta E1	Cape Canaveral, LC-17B		Retired	1973	
Intelsat II F-4	28 September 1967; 00:45:00	Delta E1	Cape Canaveral, LC-17B		Retired	1971-03	
==== Third generation ====
Intelsat III F-1	19 September 1968; 00:09:00	Delta M	Cape Canaveral, LC-17A	—N/a	Failed	—N/a	Delta control failure. Vehicle began breaking up at T+102 seconds followed by RSO destruct T+108 seconds.
Intelsat III F-2	19 December 1968; 00:32:00	Delta M	Cape Canaveral, LC-17A		Retired		Operated for one and a half years
Intelsat III F-3	6 February 1969; 00:39:00	Delta M	Cape Canaveral, LC-17A		Retired	1979-04	Operated for seven years
Intelsat III F-4	22 May 1969; 02:00:00	Delta M	Cape Canaveral, LC-17A		Retired		Operated for three years
Intelsat III F-5	26 July 1969; 02:06:00	Delta M	Cape Canaveral, LC-17A	—N/a	Failed	—N/a	Launch failure, third stage malfunction
Intelsat III F-6	15 January 1970; 00:16:03	Delta M	Cape Canaveral, LC-17A	—N/a	Retired	—N/a	Operated for two years
Intelsat III F-7	23 April 1970; 00:46:12	Delta M	Cape Canaveral, LC-17A		Retired		Operated for sixteen years
Intelsat III F-8	23 July 1970; 23:23:00	Delta M	Cape Canaveral, LC-17A	—N/a	Failed	—N/a	Apogee motor failed
==== Fourth generation ==== ===== Block 1 =====
Intelsat IV F-1	21 May 1975; 22:04:00	Atlas SLV-3D Centaur-D1A	Cape Canaveral, LC-36A		Retired		
Intelsat IV F-2	26 January 1971; 00:36:03	Atlas SLV-3C Centaur-D	Cape Canaveral, LC-36A		Retired		
Intelsat IV F-3	20 December 1971; 01:10:04	Atlas SLV-3C Centaur-D	Cape Canaveral, LC-36A		Retired		
Intelsat IV F-4	23 January 1972; 00:12:04	Atlas SLV-3C Centaur-D	Cape Canaveral, LC-36B		Retired		
Intelsat IV F-5	13 June 1972; 21:53:04	Atlas SLV-3C Centaur-D	Cape Canaveral, LC-36B		Retired		
Intelsat IV F-6	20 February 1975; 23:35:00	Atlas SLV-3D Centaur-D1A	Cape Canaveral, LC-36A	—N/a	Failed	—N/a	Launch failure. Improper separation of a lanyard during booster jettison caused the Atlas's guidance computer to reset itself. Control of the booster was gradually lost. RSO T+403 seconds.
Intelsat IV F-7	23 August 1973; 22:57:02	Atlas SLV-3D Centaur-D1A	Cape Canaveral, LC-36A		Retired		
Intelsat IV F-8	21 November 1974; 23:43:59	Atlas SLV-3D Centaur-D1A	Cape Canaveral, LC-36B		Retired		
===== Block 2 =====
Intelsat IVA F-1	26 September 1975; 00:17:00	Atlas SLV-3D Centaur-D1AR	Cape Canaveral, LC-36B		Retired		
Intelsat IVA F-2	29 January 1976; 23:56	Atlas SLV-3D Centaur-D1AR	Cape Canaveral, LC-36B		Retired		
Intelsat IVA F-3	7 January 1978; 00:15:00	Atlas SLV-3D Centaur-D1AR	Cape Canaveral, LC-36B		Retired		
Intelsat IVA F-4	26 May 1977; 21:47:01	Atlas SLV-3D Centaur-D1AR	Cape Canaveral, LC-36A		Retired		
Intelsat IVA F-5	30 September 1977; 01:02:59	Atlas SLV-3D Centaur-D1AR	Cape Canaveral, LC-36A	—N/a	Failed	—N/a	Launch failure. Gas generator leak caused a fire in the Atlas's engine compartment leading to loss of control starting at T+30 seconds. Payload fairing and satellite were stripped away, followed by vehicle breakup at T+55 seconds. The Centaur was ejected from the exploding booster intact and the destruct command was sent to it a few seconds later.
Intelsat IVA F-6	31 March 1978; 23:36:01	Atlas SLV-3D Centaur-D1AR	Cape Canaveral, LC-36B		Retired		

=== Generations 5-6 (1980–1991) ===
Satellite	Launch (UTC)	Rocket	Launch site	Longitude	Fate	Out of Service	Remarks
==== Fifth generation ==== ===== Block 1 =====
Intelsat V F-1	23 May 1981; 22:42	Atlas SLV-3D Centaur-D1AR	Cape Canaveral, LC-36B		Retired		
Intelsat V F-2	6 December 1980; 23:31	Atlas SLV-3D Centaur-D1AR	Cape Canaveral, LC-36B		Retired		
Intelsat V F-3	15 December 1981; 23:35	Atlas SLV-3D Centaur-D1AR	Cape Canaveral, LC-36B		Retired		
Intelsat V F-4	5 March 1982; 00:23	Atlas SLV-3D Centaur-D1AR	Cape Canaveral, LC-36A		Retired		
Intelsat V F-5	28 September 1982; 23:17	Atlas SLV-3D Centaur-D1AR	Cape Canaveral, LC-36B		Retired		
Intelsat V F-6	19 May 1983; 22:26	Atlas SLV-3D Centaur-D1AR	Cape Canaveral, LC-36A		Retired		
Intelsat V F-7	19 October 1983; 00:45:36	Ariane 1	Kourou, ELA-1		Retired		
Intelsat V F-8	5 March 1984; 00:50:03	Ariane 1	Kourou, ELA-1		Retired		
Intelsat V F-9	9 June 1984; 23:03	Atlas G Centaur-D1AR	Cape Canaveral, LC-36B	—N/a	Failed	—N/a	Launch failure. Centaur broke up in orbit, making it impossible for the satellite to attain its intended altitude.
===== Block 2 =====
Intelsat VA F-10	22 March 1985; 23:55	Atlas G Centaur-D1AR	Cape Canaveral LC-36B		Retired		
Intelsat VA F-11	30 June 1985; 00:44	Atlas G Centaur-D1AR	Cape Canaveral LC-36B	27.5°W	Retired		
Intelsat VA F-12	28 September 1985; 23:17	Atlas G Centaur-D1AR	Cape Canaveral LC-36B		Retired		
Intelsat VA F-13	17 May 1988; 23:58:00	Ariane 2	Kourou ELA-1		Sold		To New Skies as NSS-513
Intelsat VA F-14	31 May 1986; 00:53:03	Ariane 2	Kourou ELA-1	—N/a	Failed	—N/a	Launch failure, third stage failed to ignite
Intelsat VA F-15	27 January 1989; 01:21:00	Ariane 2	Kourou ELA-1		Sold		To Columbia Communications Corporation as Columbia 515
==== Sixth generation ====
Intelsat 601	29 October 1991; 23:08:08	Ariane 44L	Kourou ELA-2		Sold	2007-10	to Europe*Star, decommissioned in 2011
Intelsat 602	17 October 1989; 23:05:00	Ariane 44L	Kourou ELA-2		Retired		
Intelsat 603	14 March 1990; 11:52	Commercial Titan III	Cape Canaveral LC-40		Retired	2013-01	Launch failure. Titan second stage failed to separate from the Centaur, leaving the Intelsat in LEO. Reboosted by Space Shuttle Endeavour on STS-49
Intelsat 604	23 June 1990; 11:19	Commercial Titan III	Cape Canaveral LC-40		Retired	2006-04-06	
Intelsat 605	14 August 1991; 23:15:13	Ariane 44L	Kourou ELA-2		Retired	2009-01	

=== Generations 7-10 (1993–2004) ===
Satellite	Launch (UTC)	Rocket	Launch site	Longitude	Fate	Out of Service	Remarks
==== Seventh generation ====
Intelsat 701	22 October 1993; 06:46:00	Ariane 44LP	Kourou ELA-2	29.5°W	Retired		
Intelsat 702	17 June 1994; 07:07:19	Ariane 44LP	Kourou ELA-2	32.9°E	Retired		
Intelsat 703	6 October 1994; 06:35:02	Atlas IIAS	Cape Canaveral LC-36B		Sold		To New Skies as NSS-703
Intelsat 704	10 January 1995; 06:18	Atlas IIAS	Cape Canaveral LC-36B		Retired		
Intelsat 705	22 March 1995; 06:18	Atlas IIAS	Cape Canaveral LC-36B		Retired	1 February 2011	
Intelsat 706	17 May 1995; 06:34:00	Ariane 44LP	Kourou ELA-2		Retired		
Intelsat 707	14 March 1996; 07:11:01	Ariane 44LP	Kourou ELA-2		Retired		
Intelsat 708	14 February 1996; 19:01	Long March 3B	Xichang LA-2	—N/a	Failed	—N/a	Launch failure, carrier rocket went out of control two seconds after launch.
Intelsat 709	15 June 1996; 06:55:09	Ariane 44LP	Kourou ELA-2		Retired		
==== Eighth generation ====
Intelsat 801	1 March 1997; 01:07:42	Ariane 44P	Kourou ELA-2		Retired		
Intelsat 802	25 June 1997; 23:44:00	Ariane 44P	Kourou ELA-2	33°E	Retired		
Intelsat 803	23 September 1997; 23:58	Ariane 42L	Kourou ELA-2		Sold		To New Skies as NSS-803, later NSS-5
Intelsat 804	22 December 1997; 00:16	Ariane 42L	Kourou ELA-2		Failed	15 January 2005	
Intelsat 805	18 June 1998; 22:48	Atlas IIAS	Cape Canaveral SLC-36A	169° E	Retired		Was replaced at 169° E by Horizons-3e in 2018
Intelsat 806	28 February 1998; 00:21	Atlas IIAS	Cape Canaveral SLC-36B		Sold		To New Skies as NSS-806
==== Ninth generation ====
Intelsat 901	9 June 2001; 06:46	Ariane 44L	Kourou ELA-2	27.5°W	Retired		Was replaced at 18° W by Intelsat 37e in 2018. Satellite was towed to 27.5°W by MEV-1 to replace the decommissioned Intelsat 907. Eventually towed by MEV-1 in April 2025 to a graveyard orbit.
Intelsat 902	30 August 2001; 06:46	Ariane 44L	Kourou ELA-2	50°W	Retired		Was replaced at 62°E by Intelsat 39 in 2019.
Intelsat 903	30 March 2002; 17:25:00	Proton + Blok DM-03	Baikonur Site 81/23	31°W	Retired		Was replaced at 34.5°W by Intelsat 35e in 2017.
Intelsat 904	23 February 2002; 06:59	Ariane 44L	Kourou ELA-2	29.5°W	Retired		Was replaced at 60°E by Intelsat 33e in 2016.
Intelsat 905	5 June 2002; 06:44	Ariane 44L	Kourou ELA-2	24.5°W	Inclined orbit		
Intelsat 906	6 September 2002; 06:44	Ariane 44L	Kourou ELA-2	64.15°E	Inclined orbit		
Intelsat 907	15 February 2003; 07:00	Ariane 44L	Kourou ELA-2	27.5°W	Retired		Was replaced at 27.5°W by Intelsat 901
==== Tenth generation ====
Intelsat 10-01	Not launched						
Intelsat 10-02	16 June 2004; 22:27:00	Proton-M / Briz-M	Baikonur Site 200/39	1°W	Active		Currently docked with MEV-2 in April 2021 and in the process of being towed to its final orbit.

=== Rebranded PanAmSat constellation (1994–2007) ===
Satellite	Launch (UTC)	Rocket	Launch site	Longitude	Fate	Out of Service	Remarks
Intelsat 1R	16 November 2000; 01:07:07	Ariane 44LP	Kourou ELA-2	157°W	Retired		ex PAS-1R of PanAmSat. Replaced by Intelsat 14 at 45°W in 2010 and moved to 50° W, where it was finally replaced by Intelsat 29e in 2016.
Intelsat 2	8 July 1994; 23:05:32	Ariane 44L	Kourou ELA-2		Retired		ex PAS-2 of PanAmSat
Intelsat 3R	12 January 1996; 23:10:00	Ariane 44L	Kourou ELA-2		Retired		ex PAS-3R of PanAmSat
Intelsat 4	3 August 1996; 22:58:00	Ariane 42L	Kourou ELA-2		Retired		ex PAS-4 of PanAmSat
Intelsat 5	28 August 1997; 00:33:30	Proton-K / DM3	Baikonur Site 81/23	157°E	Leased		ex PAS-5 of PanAmSat, leased to Arabsat as Arabsat 2C and Badr-C. Battery degradation reduced capacity by over 50%.
Intelsat 7	16 September 1998; 06:31	Ariane 44LP	Kourou ELA-2		Retired		ex PAS-7 of PanAmSat, power system anomaly.
Intelsat 8	4 November 1998; 05:12:00	Proton-K / DM3	Baikonur Site 81/23	169°E	Retired		ex PAS-8 of PanAmSat
Intelsat 9	28 July 2000; 22:42:00	Zenit-3SL	Ocean Odyssey	50.1° W	Retired		ex PAS-9 of PanAmSat
Intelsat 10	15 May 2001; 01:11:30	Proton-K / DM3	Baikonur Site 81/23	47.5° E	Retired		ex PAS-10 of PanAmSat
Intelsat 11	5 October 2007; 22:02	Ariane 5 GS	Kourou ELA-3	43° W	Retired		ex PAS-11 of PanAmSat
Intelsat 12	29 October 2000; 05:59	Ariane 44LP	Kourou ELA-2	64.2° E	Retired		ex Europe*Star 1 or Loral Skynet, PAS-12 of PanAmSat

=== Recent spacecraft (since 2009) ===
Satellite	Launch (UTC)	Rocket	Launch site	Longitude	Fate	Out of Service	Remarks
Intelsat 14	23 November 2009	Atlas V 431	Cape Canaveral SLC-41	45° W	Active		Replaced Intelsat 1R
Intelsat 15	30 November 2009	Zenit-3SLB	Baikonur Site 45/1	85.15° E	Active		Shared with JSAT as JCSAT-85.
Intelsat 16	12 February 2010	Proton-M / Briz-M	Baikonur Site 200/39	58.1° W	Active		Launched, ex PAS-11R of PanAmSat
Intelsat 17	26 November 2010	Ariane 5 ECA; V-198 (556)	Kourou ELA-3	66° E	Active		
Intelsat 18	2011-10-05	Zenit-3SLB	Baikonur	180°E	Active		
Intelsat 19	2012-06-01	Zenit-3SL	Ocean Odyssey	166°E	Active		Second solar panel failed to deploy
Intelsat 20	2012-08-02	Ariane 5 ECA; VA-208 (564)	Kourou ELA-3	68.5°E	Active		
Intelsat 21	2012-08-19	Zenit-3SL	Ocean Odyssey	58°W	Active		
Intelsat 22	2012-03-25	Proton-M / Briz-M	Baikonur	72.1°E	Active		
Intelsat 23	2012-10-14	Proton-M / Briz-M	Baikonur	53°W	Active		
Intelsat 24	1996-05-16	Ariane 44L	Kourou ELA-2	31°E	Retired		ex Amos-1 of Spacecom, acquired in 2009
Intelsat 25	2008-07-07	Ariane 5 ECA; V-184 (541)	Kourou ELA-3	31.5°W	Active		ex ProtoStar 1 of ProtoStar, acquired in October 2009
Intelsat 26	1997-02-12	Atlas IIA	Canaveral LC-36B	62.6°E	Inclined orbit		ex JCSat-R of SKY Perfect JSAT Group, acquired in 2009, leased to Türksat
Intelsat 27	2013-02-01; 06:56	Zenit-3SL	Ocean Odyssey	55°W (planned)	Failed	—N/a	Launch failure
Intelsat 28 (New Dawn)	2011-04-22; 21:37	Ariane 5 ECA; VA-201 (558)	Kourou	32.8°E	Active		ex New Dawn
Intelsat 29e	2016-01-27; 23:20	Ariane 5 ECA; VA-228 (583)	Kourou	50°W	Failed		First in Epic^{NG} series over twice the weight of preceding generation, featuring multi beam and all digital design with 3-5 times the capacity and 10 times the throughput. Replaced Intelsat 1R.
Intelsat 30 (DLA-1)	2014-10-16; 21:43	Ariane 5 ECA; VA-220 (574)	Kourou	95.5°W	Active		Operated by Intelsat for DirecTV Latin America (DLA)
Intelsat 31 (DLA-2)	2016-06-09; 21:43	Proton-M / Briz-M	Baikonur	95.1°W	Active		Operated by Intelsat for DirecTV Latin America (DLA)
Intelsat 32e (SKY-B1)	2017-02-14; 21:59	Ariane 5 ECA	Kourou	43°W	Active		Operated by Intelsat for SKY Brasil. Part of Epic^{NG} series, will replace Intelsat 11.
Intelsat 33e	2016-08-24; 22:16	Ariane 5 ECA; VA-232 (586)	Kourou	60°E	Failed	19 October 2024	Second Epic^{NG}. Replaced Intelsat 904 Failed in orbit and disintegrated into pieces.
Intelsat 34	2015-08-20; 20:34	Ariane 5 ECA; VA-225 (579)	Kourou	55.5°W	Active		
Intelsat 35e	2017-07-05; 23:38	Falcon 9 Full Thrust	KSC, LC-39A	34.5°W	Active		Epic^{NG} series, replaced Intelsat 903
Intelsat 36	2016-08-24; 22:16	Ariane 5 ECA; VA-232 (586)	Kourou	68.5°E	Active		
Intelsat 37e	2017-09-27; 21:47	Ariane 5 ECA; VA-239 (5100)	Kourou	18°W	Active		Epic^{NG} series, replaced Intelsat 901
Intelsat 38 (Azerspace-2)	2018-09-18	Ariane 5 ECA; VA-243	Kourou	45°E	Active		Operated by Intelsat for Azercosmos.
Intelsat 39	2019-08-06; 19:30	Ariane 5 ECA	Kourou	62°E	Active		Replaced Intelsat 902
Intelsat 40e	2023-04-07; 04:30	Falcon 9 Block 5	Cape Canaveral; SLC-40	91°W	Active		The TEMPO instrument is hosted on this spacecraft.
Intelsat 41	—N/a	—N/a	—N/a	—N/a	Canceled		Canceled in 2026.
Intelsat 42	2027	TBA	TBA	332.9°E	Planned		
Intelsat 43	2027	TBA	TBA	99°W	Planned		
Intelsat 44	—N/a	—N/a	—N/a	—N/a	Canceled		Canceled in 2026.
Intelsat 45	2027	Ariane 64	Kourou	180°E	Planned		
Intelsat 46e	2023-02-07; 01:32	Falcon 9 Block 5	Cape Canaveral; SLC-40	61°W	Active		Result of the acquisition of capacity on Hispasat's Amazonas Nexus satellite.

== Other brands ==
Satellite	Launch (UTC)	Rocket	Launch site	Longitude	Fate	Out of Service	Remarks
=== Galaxy (Intelsat Americas, since 1992) ===
Galaxy 3C	2002-06-15; 22:39:30	Zenit-3SL	Ocean Odyssey	95.05°W	Retired		ex PAS-9, Galaxy 13 of PanAmSat
Galaxy 4R	2000-04-19; 00:29	Ariane 44L	Kourou ELA-2	76.85°W	Failed	April 2009	XIPS malfunction
Galaxy 5	1992-05-14; 17:32:41	Atlas I	Cape Canaveral	125°W	Retired	January 2005	
Galaxy 9	1996-05-24; 01:09:59	Delta II 7925	Cape Canaveral LC-17B	81°W	Retired	June 2010	
Galaxy 10R	2000-01-25; 01:04	Ariane 44L	Kourou ELA-2	123°W	Failed	June 2008	XIPS malfunction
Galaxy 11	1999-12-22; 00:50	Ariane 44L	Kourou ELA-2	55.6°W	Active		Reduced power due to solar reflector fogging
Galaxy 12	2003-04-09; 22:52:19	Ariane 5 G	Kourou ELA-3	129°W	Active		
Galaxy 13	See Horizons-1						
Galaxy 14	2005-08-13; 23:28:26	Soyuz-FG/Fregat	Baikonur Site 31/6	125°W	Active		ex Galaxy 5R
Galaxy 15	2005-10-13; 22:32	Ariane 5 GS	Kourou ELA-3	133°W	Failed	31 August 2022.	ex Galaxy 1RR; Transmits WAAS; Suffered uncontrolled drift in 2010
Galaxy 16	2006-06-18; 07:50	Zenit-3SL	Ocean Odyssey	99°W	Active		
Galaxy 17	2007-05-04; 22:29	Ariane 5 ECA	Kourou ELA-3	91°W	Active		
Galaxy 18	2008-05-21; 09:43	Zenit-3SL	Ocean Odyssey	133°W	Active		
Galaxy 19	2008-09-24; 09:28	Zenit-3SL	Ocean Odyssey	97°W	Active		ex Intelsat Americas 9
Galaxy 23	2003-08-08; 03:30:55	Zenit-3SL	Ocean Odyssey	121°W	Retired		Part of EchoStar IX spacecraft. ex Telstar 13 of Space Systems Loral, Intelsat Americas 13
Galaxy 25	1997-05-24; 17:00:00	Proton-K/DM4	Baikonur Site 81/23	93.1°W	Active		ex Telstar 5 of Space Systems Loral, Intelsat Americas 5
Galaxy 26	1999-02-15; 05:12:00	Proton-K/DM3	Baikonur Site 81/23	50°E	Retired	7 June 2014	ex Telstar 6 of Space Systems Loral, Intelsat Americas 6
Galaxy 27	1999-09-25; 06:29	Ariane 44LP	Kourou ELA-2	66°E	Retired		ex Telstar 7 of Space Systems Loral, Intelsat Americas 7
Galaxy 28	2005-06-23; 14:03:00	Zenit-3SL	Ocean Odyssey	89°W	Active		ex Telstar 8 of Space Systems Loral, Intelsat Americas 8
Galaxy 30	2020-08-15; 14:03:00	Ariane 5 ECA+	Kourou ELA-3	125°W	Active		
Galaxy 31	2022-11-12 16:06:00	Falcon 9 Block 5	CCSFS, SLC-40	121°W	Active		Built by Maxar, replaced Galaxy 23.
Galaxy 32	2022-11-12 16:06:00	Falcon 9 Block 5	CCSFS, SLC-40	91°W	Active		Built by Maxar, replaced Galaxy 17.
Galaxy 33	2022-10-08; 23:05:00	Falcon 9 Block 5	CCSFS, SLC-40	133°W	Active		Built by Northrop Grumman, will replace Galaxy 15, enter service in November 2022 (planned)
Galaxy 34	2022-10-08; 23:05:00	Falcon 9 Block 5	CCSFS, SLC-40	129°W	Active		Built by Northrop Grumman, will replace Galaxy 12.
Galaxy 35	2022-12-13; 20:30:07	Ariane 5 ECA	Kourou ELA-3	93°W (2023)	Active		Built by Maxar, to LAPD.
Galaxy 36	2022-12-13; 20:30:07	Ariane 5 ECA	Kourou ELA-3	89°W	Active		Built by Maxar, will replace Galaxy 28.
Galaxy 37	2023-08-03; 05:00:00	Falcon 9 Block 5	Cape Canaveral SLC-40	127°W	Active		Built by Maxar, will replace Galaxy 13.
=== Horizons (since 2003) === Horizons satellites are operated by Horizons Satellite, a joint subsidiary of Intelsat and SKY Perfect JSAT Group
Horizons-1	2003-10-01; 04:02:59	Zenit-3SL	Ocean Odyssey	127°W	Active		Also designated Galaxy 13
Horizons-2	2007-12-21; 21:41:55	Ariane 5 GS	Kourou ELA-3	84.85°E	Active		
Horizons-3e	2018-09-18	Ariane 5 ECA	Kourou ELA-3	169°E	Active		Part of the Epic^{NG} family. Covers the Asia/Pacific region and replaces Intelsat 805.
=== Intelsat APR (1998–1999) === Intelsat APR designations are given to leased capacity on satellites which are not owned by Intelsat
Intelsat APR-1	1998-07-18; 09:20	Long March 3B	Xichang LA-2	146°E	Retired		Leased capacity on Sinosat-1
Intelsat APR-2	1999-04-02; 22:03	Ariane 42P	Kourou ELA-2	83°E	Retired		Leased capacity on INSAT-2E
Intelsat APR-3	See Intelsat K-TV						
=== Intelsat K (1992) ===
Intelsat K	1992-06-10; 00:00	Atlas IIA	Canaveral LC-36B	21.5°W	Retired	August 2002	ex Satcom K4 of GE Americom, transferred to spin-off New Skies as NSS-K
Intelsat K-TV	Not launched, sold to New Skies as NSS K-TV, NSS-6, to Sinosat as Sinosat-1B with transponders for lease back to Intelsat as Intelsat APR-3, to Hellas Sat as Hellas Sat 2 before launch on 13 May 2003.						
=== Miscellaneous (1976, 1990) ===
Marisat-F2	14 October 1976	Delta 2914	Canaveral LC-17A	176.0° E (1976–1991); 178.0° W (1991–1996); 33.9° W (1999–2008)	Retired	October 2008	Ex COMSAT, acquired from Lockheed Martin
SBS-6	12 October 1990; 22:58:18	Ariane 44L	Kourou ELA-2	80.9° W	Retired	February 2009	ex Satellite Business Systems
