= 27th meridian =

27th meridian may refer to:

- 27th meridian east, a line of longitude east of the Greenwich Meridian
- 27th meridian west, a line of longitude west of the Greenwich Meridian
