= 26th meridian =

26th meridian may refer to:

- 26th meridian east, a line of longitude east of the Greenwich Meridian
- 26th meridian west, a line of longitude west of the Greenwich Meridian
