= List of shipwrecks in May 1845 =

The list of shipwrecks in May 1845 includes ships sunk, foundered, wrecked, grounded, or otherwise lost during May 1845.

== 1 May ==
List of shipwrecks: 1 May 1845
Ship	State	Description
Benledi	United Kingdom	The paddle steamer ran aground on the East Hoyle Bank, in Liverpool Bay. All on board were rescued. She was on a voyage from Rhyl, Caernarfonshire to Liverpool, Lancashire. Benledi was refloated and put in to Hoylake, Cheshire.
Hortense	France	The schooner was driven ashore and wrecked on the south coast of Skagen, Denmark. Her crew were rescued. She was on a voyage from Rouen, Seine-Inférieure to Aalborg, Denmark.

== 2 May ==
List of shipwrecks: 2 May 1845
Ship	State	Description
Duke of Sussex	United Kingdom	The steamship sprang a leak in the English Channel off Cap Gris Nez, Pas-de-Calais, France, extinguishing the fires in her engines. She was subsequently wrecked at Boulogne, Pas-de-Calais. All on board survived. She was on a voyage from London to Boulogne.
Eliza	United Kingdom	The ship capsized and sank off the Saltee Islands, County Wexford. Her crew were rescued. She was on a voyage from Waterford to Caernarfon.
James Saville	United Kingdom	The schooner was driven ashore at Redcar, Yorkshire. She was refloated and taken in to Whitby, Yorkshire.
Jupiter	United Kingdom	The ship was sunk by ice in the Atlantic Ocean. Her crew were rescued by Alfred (United Kingdom). She was on a voyage from Liverpool, Lancashire to Saint John, New Brunswick, British North America.
Mary	(United Kingdom of Great Britain and Ireland) British North America	The ship capsized near "Monhegua". Her crew were rescued.. She was on a voyage from Boston, Massachusetts, United States to Digby, Nova Scotia.
Oscar	United Kingdom	The ship was sighted whilst on a voyage from Cádiz, Spain to Saint Johns, Newfoundland. No further trace, presumed sunk by ice in the Atlantic Ocean with the loss of all hands.
Thomas and Mary	United Kingdom	The ship was sunk by ice in the Atlantic Ocean. Her crew were rescued by Swift ( (United Kingdom of Great Britain and Ireland) British North America). Thomas and Mary was on a voyage from Sunderland, County Durham to Quebec City, Province of Canada, British North America.
Wilhelmine	Elbing	The ship was driven ashore at Skagen, Denmark. She was on a voyage from Lisbon, Portugal to Gothenburg, Sweden. She was refloated and resumed her voyage.

== 3 May ==
List of shipwrecks: 3 May 1845
Ship	State	Description
Chicora	United States	The ship ran aground north of Rønne, Denmark. She was on a voyage from Boston, Massachusetts to Saint Petersburg, Russia. She was refloated and resumed her voyage.
Eleanor	Stettin	The ship was wrecked on the Kern Reef, in the North Sea off the coast of South Holland, Netherlands. Her crew survived. She was on a voyage from Faial Island, Azores to Stettin.
Patrius	(United Kingdom of Great Britain and Ireland) British North America	The ship was driven ashore on Miscou Island, New Brunswick.

== 4 May ==
List of shipwrecks: 4 May 1845
Ship	State	Description
Herald	United Kingdom	The schooner sprang a leak and was abandoned in the Atlantic Ocean 32 nautical miles (59 km) off Cape St Mary, Portugal (36°27′N 6°20′W). Her crew were rescued by Carl Iohan (Sweden). Herald was on a voyage from Messina, Sicily to Liverpool, Lancashire.
Princess	United Kingdom	The ship was driven ashore near Saint John, New Brunswick, British North America. She was on a voyage from Saint John to Dublin. She was refloated on 6 May and put back to Saint John in a waterlogged condition.
Salus	United Kingdom	The ship was driven ashore on Westray, Orkney Islands. Her crew were rescued. She was on a voyage from South Shields, County Durham to Quebec City, Province of Canada, British North America. She was refloated on 19 May and taken in to Stromness, Orkney Islands.
Tom Cringle	United Kingdom	The ship was driven ashore on the Dipper Harbour Ledges, off the coast of New Brunswick with the loss of twelve of her thirteen crew. She was on a voyage from Boston, Massachusetts, United States to a port in New Brunswick.

== 5 May ==
List of shipwrecks: 5 May 1845
Ship	State	Description
Adams	United Kingdom	The ship was destroyed by fire at Maranhão, Brazil. All passengers and crew safely evacuated the ship.
Anne	United Kingdom	The ship ran aground off Westport, County Mayo. She was on a voyage from Wesport to Sligo. She was refloated and beached at Wesport.
Ecilion	United Kingdom	The brig was sunk by ice in the Atlantic Ocean. Her crew were rescued by Allison and Eagle (both United Kingdom).
Eliza Ann	United Kingdom	The ship was severely damaged by ice in the Atlantic Ocean. Her passengers were taken off by Countess of Durham and Neptune (both United Kingdom). Eliza Ann was on a voyage from Cork to Saint John, New Brunswick, British North America.
Priam	United Kingdom	The ship was wrecked on Cozumel, Mexico. Her crew were rescued. She was on a voyage from British Honduras to London.
Virginia	United States	The ship was destroyed by fire off Calcutta, India with the loss of a crew member.

== 6 May ==
List of shipwrecks: 6 May 1845
Ship	State	Description
Adams	United Kingdom	The ship was destroyed by fire at Maranhão, Brazil.
Ann Jones	United Kingdom	The ship was driven ashore at Cimbritshamn, Sweden. She was later refloated.
Catharina Maria	Sweden	The ship was abandoned in the Baltic Sea south of Møn, Denmark with the loss of all but two of her seven crew. She was on a voyage from Kalmar to Copenhagen, Denmark.
Charlotte	United Kingdom	The ship ran aground at the mouth of the "Forecoreah River". She was consequently condemned.
Chase	United Kingdom	The ship was driven ashore at Copenhagen, Denmark. She was on a voyage from Newcastle upon Tyne, Northumberland to Copenhagen.
Joseph P. Dobree	United Kingdom	The brig was wrecked on the Folly Reef, off the coast of Haiti. She was on a voyage from Liverpool to Port Royal, Jamaica.
Mischief	United Kingdom	The brig ran aground on the Malora Bank, in the Mediterranean Sea off the coast of the Grand Duchy of Tuscany. She was on a voyage from Livorno to London. She was refloated and taken in to Livorno for repairs.
Tugend Albrecht	Prussia	The ship ran aground on the Abertay Sand. She was on a voyage from Pillau to Dundee, Forfarshire, United Kingdom.
Yorkshire	United Kingdom	The ship ran aground off Key West, Florida, United States. She was on a voyage from New Orleans, Louisiana to Liverpool, Lancashire. She was refloated the next.

== 7 May ==
List of shipwrecks: 7 May 1845
Ship	State	Description
Ayrshire Lass	United Kingdom	The ship was driven ashore and damaged in the Bermuda Islands. She was refloated and taken in to St. George's.
Havana	United Kingdom	The brig was wrecked on the coast of Africa.
Lady Constable	United Kingdom	The ship ran aground on the Burbo Bank, in Liverpool Bay and was damaged. She was on a voyage from Liverpool, Lancashire to Richibucto, New Brunswick, British North America. She was refloated and put back to Liverpool.
Maria Louisa	Flag unknown	The ship was lost near "Tanjong Pisoh" with the loss of four lives.
Robina	Sweden	The ship was wrecked on the Dogger Bank with the loss of two of her crew. She was on a voyage from Gothenburg to Hull, Yorkshire, United Kingdom.
Yorkshire	United Kingdom	The ship was driven ashore "on the Marques".

== 8 May ==
List of shipwrecks: 8 May 1845
Ship	State	Description
Coquette	(United Kingdom of Great Britain and Ireland) British North America	The schooner was wrecked in the Magdalen Islands, Nova Scotia. She was on a voyage from Quebec City, Province of Canada to Glasgow, Renfrewshire.
Coringa Packet	(United Kingdom of Great Britain and Ireland) New South Wales	The ship was wrecked on a coral reef (10°56′30″S 149°55′00″E). All on board were rescued; ten of them by Spy (United Kingdom). Coringa Packet was on a voyage from Sydney to Ceylon and Madras, India.
Jeune Ernest	France	The ship was wrecked off Cape Mougan with the loss of two of her crew. She was on a voyage from Cayenne, French Guiana to Jacmel.
Mitau	Russia	The steamship was abandoned in the North Sea and was presumed to have subsequently foundered. Her crew were rescued by the schooner Roberts (Sweden). She was on a voyage from Hull, Yorkshire, United Kingdom to Riga.
Nautilus	United Kingdom	The ship was wrecked on the Skewith Sands. She was on a voyage from Abertawe to Aberavon, Glamorgan.
Pemmer	Prussia	The ship capsized at Memel.

== 9 May ==
List of shipwrecks: 9 May 1845
Ship	State	Description
Susan	United Kingdom	The ship was driven ashore and wrecked on the Île de Ré, Finistère, France. Her crew were rescued. She was on a voyage from Glasgow, Renfrewshire to the Charente.

== 10 May ==
List of shipwrecks: 10 May 1845
Ship	State	Description
Æolus	(Russian Empire) Grand Duchy of Finland	The ship was driven ashore on the Swedish coast. She was on a voyage from Hull, Yorkshire, United Kingdom to Fredrikshavn, Denmark. She was refloated and put in to Copenhagen, Denmark.
Annabella	United Kingdom	The ship was sunk by ice in the Atlantic Ocean. Her crew were rescued by Alert (United Kingdom). Annabella was on a voyage from Liverpool, Lancashire to Saint John, New Brunswick, British North America.
Dristig	Norway	The ship ran aground and was wrecked off "Bangbostrand", Denmark. Her crew were rescued.
Juno	Prussia	The ship was driven ashore at Cromer, Norfolk, United Kingdom.
Rhydiol	United Kingdom	The brig was sunk by ice in the Atlantic Ocean (47°30′N 46°30′W). All on board were rescued.

== 11 May ==
List of shipwrecks: 11 May 1845
Ship	State	Description
Trio	United Kingdom	The ship was in collision with Eclipse (United Kingdom) in the North Sea off the coast of Forfarshire and was abandoned. Her crew were rescued by Eclipse. Trio was on a voyage from Montrose, Forfarshire to Newcastle upon Tyne, Northumberland.

== 12 May ==
List of shipwrecks: 12 May 1845
Ship	State	Description
Edward	United Kingdom	The barque was wrecked on the Scroby Sands, Norfolk. All twelve people on board were rescued. She was on a voyage from Hartlepool, County Durham to London.

== 13 May ==
List of shipwrecks: 13 May 1845
Ship	State	Description
Anna Magdalena	Flag unknown	The ship was discovered derelict on the Maplin Sands, in the North Sea off the coast of Essex, United Kingdom. She was taken in to Gravesend, Kent, United Kingdom.
Dove	United States	The ship was wrecked at Fort Independence, Massachusetts She was on a voyage from Liverpool, Nova Scotia, British North America to Boston, Massachusetts.
Jane Smith	United Kingdom	The ship ran aground and was wrecked off Terschelling, Friesland, Netherlands. Her crew were rescued. She was on a voyage from London to Hamburg.
Jeune Heloise	France	The schooner was wrecked at La Perlepoir, Martinique.
Motion	United Kingdom	The steam tug was run ashore and wrecked at Broadstairs, Kent. Her crew were rescued. She was on a voyage from London to Liverpool, Lancashire.
Rienzi	United States	The ship was wrecked on the Florida Reef.

== 14 May ==
List of shipwrecks: 14 May 1845
Ship	State	Description
Ada	United States	The ship ran aground off Black Island and was damaged. She was on a voyage from Demerara, British Guiana to New Bedford, Massachusetts. She was refloated and resumed her voyage, arriving at New Bedford the next day.
Ann Jane	United Kingdom	The barque was wrecked on a reef north of Grand Bahama. she was on a voyage from Mobile, Alabama, United States to Quebec City, Province of Canada, British North America.
Aquatic	United Kingdom	The schooner was driven ashore on Spurn Point, Yorkshire. She was on a voyage from Hull, Yorkshire to Whitstable, Kent.
Marina	United Kingdom	The ship was driven ashore at Girgenti, Sicily. She was on a voyage from Bristol, Gloucestershire to Girgenti.

== 15 May ==
List of shipwrecks: 15 May 1845
Ship	State	Description
Ann Jane	United Kingdom	The ship was wrecked on a reef north of Grand Bahama.
Elizabeth	United Kingdom	The ship was abandoned in the Mediterranean Sea off Mallorca, Spain. Her crew were resched by Eugene (flag unknown). Elizabeth was on a voyage from Troon, Ayrshire to Malta.
Hannah Kerr	United Kingdom	The ship was driven ashore on Sandy Key, west of Grand Bahama. She was on a voyage from Mobile, Alabama, United States to Quebec City, Province of Canada, British North America. She was refloated on 18 May and put into Nassau, Bahamas.
Holde or Vivide	Norway	The ship ran aground at South Shields, County Durham, United Kingdom.
Lady C. Guest	United Kingdom	The ship was driven ashore at Crosby Point, Lancashire. She was on a voyage from Liverpool, Lancashire to Ancona, Papal States.
Swansea Trader	United Kingdom	The ship foundered in the North Sea 20 nautical miles (37 km) north of Cromer, Norfolk Her crew were rescued. She was on a voyage from Hull, Yorkshire to Folkestone, Kent.
Vivide	Norway	The ship was driven ashore at South Shields, County Durham, United Kingdom of Great Britain and Ireland.

== 16 May ==
List of shipwrecks: 16 May 1845
Ship	State	Description
Alicia Jane	United Kingdom	The ship was driven ashore and wrecked at Paternoster, Africa. Her crew were rescued.
Enterprise	(United Kingdom of Great Britain and Ireland) British North America	The ship was driven ashore on Spectacle Island, Maine, United States. She was on a voyage from Saint Thomas, Virgin Islands to Demerara, British Guiana and Liverpool, Nova Scotia. She was refloated the next day and resumed her voyage.
Lady Alice Lambton	United Kingdom	The ship ran aground on the Long Sand, in the North Sea off the coast of Essex. She was on a voyage from Hamburg to Saint John, New Brunswick, British North America. She was later refloated and resumed her voyage, but put in to Dartmouth, Devon for examination.
Oscar	United Kingdom	The brig ran aground on at Maplin Sand, in the North Sea off the coast of Essex. She was on a voyage from Christiana, Norway to London. She was refloated the next day and towed in to the River Thames.
Rajasthan	India	The ship was driven ashore near Tutocoreen. She was on a voyage from Cochin to Ceylon. She was later refloated and taken in to Tutocoreen.
Reform	United States	The schooner was lost on Sandy Hook. Crew saved.

== 17 May ==
List of shipwrecks: 17 May 1845
Ship	State	Description
Catherine Isabella	United Kingdom	The ship was wrecked on the Elephant Rock, Cape Colony with the loss of a crew member.
Chieftain	United Kingdom	The barque foundered off São Jorge Island, Azores. Her crew were rescued. She was on a voyage from Ichaboe Island, Portuguese West Africa to Liverpool, Lancashire.
Diamond	United Kingdom	The ship caught fire at Newport, Monmouthshire and was scuttled.
Eve	United Kingdom	The ship was driven ashore and wrecked at Paternoster, Africa. Her crew were rescued.
Hope	United Kingdom	The ship was sunk by ice in the Atlantic Ocean. All on board were rescued by British Queen and Huntcliff (both United Kingdom). She was on a voyage from Cape Breton Island, Nova Scotia, British North America to Liverpool, Lancashire.
Jeune Mathilde	France	The ship was wrecked on Heneaga, Bahamas. Her crew were rescued. She was on a voyage from Gonaïves, Haiti to Havre de Grâce, Seine-Inférieure.
Malaga	United States	The brig was in collision with an English brig in the Atlantic Ocean. She put in to Faial Island, Azores, where she was condemned.
Oscar	United Kingdom	The brig ran aground on the Maplin Sand, in the North Sea off the coast of Essex. She was on a voyage from Christiania, Norway to London. She was refloated and taken in to Sheerness, Kent.
Pelican	(United Kingdom of Great Britain and Ireland) Jersey	The ship was sunk by ice in the Atlantic Ocean. Her crew were rescued.

== 18 May ==
List of shipwrecks: 18 May 1845
Ship	State	Description
Buffalo	(United Kingdom of Great Britain and Ireland) British North America	The ship was driven ashore at West Point, Prince Edward Island. She was later refloated.
Vanguard	United Kingdom	The ship was driven ashore and wrecked on St Paul's Island, Nova Scotia, British North America. Her crew were rescued. She was on a voyage from Whitby, Yorkshire to Miramichi, New Brunswick, British North America.

== 19 May ==
List of shipwrecks: 19 May 1845
Ship	State	Description
Lamport	United Kingdom	The ship was wrecked on "Cow Bow Head". She was on a voyage from Liverpool, Lancashire to Quebec City, Province of Canada, British North America.
Rosebank	United Kingdom	The ship was wrecked near Tin Cove, Scatterie Island, Nova Scotia, British North America with the loss of one life. She was on a voyage from Belfast, County Antrim to Quebec City.
Sapphire	United Kingdom	The ship was wrecked in Cape North Bay. Her crew were rescued.

== 20 May ==
List of shipwrecks: 20 May 1845
Ship	State	Description
William IV	United Kingdom	The ship departed from Poole, Dorset for Saint John's, Newfoundland, British North America. No further trace, presumed foundered with the loss of all hands.

== 21 May ==
List of shipwrecks: 21 May 1845
Ship	State	Description
Alpha	United Kingdom	The ship struck the Sheringham Shoal, in the North Sea off the coast of Norfolk and foundered. Her crew were rescued. She was on a voyage from South Shields, County Durham to London.
Damsel	United Kingdom	The ship was driven onto the Pakefield Flats, in the North Sea off the coast of Suffolk and was abandoned with the loss of two of her five crew. She was on a voyage from Maldon, Essex. She was taken in to Lowestoft, Suffolk the next day.
Fly	United Kingdom	The ship ran aground on the Brake Sand, in the North Sea off the coast of Kent.
Harriet	(United Kingdom of Great Britain and Ireland) Jersey	The ship ran aground on the Minquiers, broke in two and sank. Her crew were rescued. She was on a voyage from Saint-Malo, Ille-et-Vilaine, France to Jersey.
Mersey	United Kingdom	The full-rigged ship was driven ashore and wrecked at South Woodland, New Jersey, United States.
Orb	United Kingdom	The ship was driven ashore at Southwold, Suffolk. Her crew were rescued. She was on a voyage from London to Whitby, Yorkshire. She was refloated the next day and taken in to Southwold.
William and Mary	(United Kingdom of Great Britain and Ireland) British North America	The brig was wrecked on Miquelon. She was on a voyage from Halifax, Nova Scotia to Quebec City, Province of Canada.

== 22 May ==
List of shipwrecks: 23 May 1845
Ship	State	Description
Oakland	United Kingdom	The full-rigged ship was wrecked on the Cregile Rocks, in Carnarvon Bay. A crew member was rescued by a lifeboat.
Prosperity	United Kingdom	The ship was wrecked at Llanddwyn Point, Caernarfonshire. Her four crew were rescued by the lifeboat № 5 (United Kingdom).

== 23 May ==
List of shipwrecks: 23 May 1845
Ship	State	Description
Arcturus	United Kingdom	The ship was driven ashore in the Dardanelles. She was refloated.
Thomas and Mary	United Kingdom	The ship was sunk by ice in the Atlantic Ocean. Her crew were rescued. She was on a voyage from Sunderland, County Durham to Quebec City, Province of Canada, British North America.
William	United Kingdom	The sloop was wrecked in the Strait of Sunda. She was on a voyage from Tarbert, Argyllshire to Glasgow, Renfrewshire.

== 24 May ==
List of shipwrecks: 24 May 1845
Ship	State	Description
Bostock	Hamburg	The galeas was driven ashore at Cuxhaven.
Diana	United Kingdom	The ship was holed by her anchor and sank at South Shields, County Durham. She was on a voyage from Dingwall, Ross-shire to Newcastle upon Tyne, Northumberland. She was refloated and beached.
Hugo	Danzig	The ship was driven ashore at Holmpton, Yorkshire, United Kingdom. She was on a voyage from Danzig to Hull, Yorkshire.. She was later refloated and taken in to Hull.
Mary	United Kingdom	The barque was wrecked in the Bass Strait with the loss of seventeen of the 59 people on board. She was on a voyage from Sydney, New South Wales to London.
Temperance	(United Kingdom of Great Britain and Ireland) Jersey	The ship was in collision with Mexico (United Kingdom and foundered in the North Sea off the Dudgeon Lightship ( Trinity House). Her crew were rescued by Mexico. Temperance was on a voyage from Cardiff, Glamorgan to Whitby, Yorkshire.

== 25 May ==
List of shipwrecks: 25 May 1845
Ship	State	Description
Hyderabad	United Kingdom	The ship ran aground on a reef off "Murray's Island". She was refloated but consequently foundered. All on board were rescued. She was on a voyage from Sydney, New South Wales to Calcutta, India.

== 26 May ==
List of shipwrecks: 26 May 1845
Ship	State	Description
Cordelia	United Kingdom	The ship sprang a leak and foundered in the Atlantic Ocean. Her crew reached Barbados in the longboat. She was on a voyage from Ichaboe Island, Portuguese West Africa to Belfast, County Antrim.
Diana	United Kingdom	The ship was destroyed by fire off "Krillen", Denmark. Her crew were rescued. She was on a voyage from Liverpool, Lancashire to Saint Petersburg, Russia.
John Thompson	United Kingdom	The ship ran aground and sank at Neath, Glamorgan. She was on a voyage from Whitehaven, Cumberland to Neath.

== 27 May ==
List of shipwrecks: 27 May 1845
Ship	State	Description
Campbells	United Kingdom	The ship ran aground on the Hollywood Bank, in the Irish Sea off the coast of County Antrim. She was on a voyage from Glasgow, Renfrewshire to Demerara, British Guiana. She was refloated on 31 May.
Earl Vane	United Kingdom	The ship was driven ashore at Sunderland, County Durham. She was on a voyage from Hamburg to Sunderland.
Eliza	United Kingdom	The smack was discovered in a capsized condition 20 leagues (60 nautical miles (110 km)) north west of Land's End, Cornwall. She was righted and towed in to the Isles of Scilly.

== 29 May ==
List of shipwrecks: 29 May 1845
Ship	State	Description
John Hendrick	Netherlands	The East Indiaman was wrecked on Saint Paul's Island (45 nautical miles (83 km) north of the equator and 29° west) with the loss of four of her 23 crew. Seven crew were rescued by Chance (United Kingdom), the rest were left on the rocks, presumed subsequently to have perished. John Hendrick was on a voyage from Amsterdam, North Holland to Batavia, Netherlands East Indies
Mary Hanney	United Kingdom	The ship caught fire and was run ashore near Helsingør, Denmark. She was on a voyage from Liverpool, Lancashire to Saint Petersburg, Russia. She was refloated on 31 May and taken in to Helsingør.
William Henry	United Kingdom	The ship was wrecked on Miquelon.

== 30 May ==
List of shipwrecks: 30 May 1845
Ship	State	Description
Ann and Marys	United Kingdom	The ship was driven ashore and sank north of Cape Bollard, Newfoundland, British North America. Her crew were rescued. She was on a voyage from Southampton, Hampshire to Miramichi, New Brunswick, British North America.
Jane	United Kingdom	The ship ran aground on the East Barrow Sand, in the North Sea off the coast of Essex. She was on a voyage from Middlesbrough, Yorkshire to Rochester, Kent. She was refloated and taken in to Sheerness, Kent in a leaky condition.
La Foi	France	The brig ran aground on the Long Sand, in the North Sea off the coast of Essex. She was on a voyage from Hamburg to Cherbourg, Seine-Inférieure. She was refloated and taken in to Wivenhoe, Essex in a leaky condition.

== 31 May ==
List of shipwrecks: 31 Mary 1845
Ship	State	Description
Lady Nepean	United Kingdom	The schooner was discovered wrecked in the North Sea off the coast of Essex by HMRC Scout ( Board of Customs). Crew presumed drowned.
Lady Saltoun	United Kingdom	The ship was holed by her anchor and sank in the River Liffey.
Maid of Athens	(United Kingdom of Great Britain and Ireland) New South Wales	The schooner was wrecked in the Torres Straits off Booby Island. Her crew were rescued on 2 May by Spy (United Kingdom). Maid of Athens was on a voyage from Sydney to Hong Kong.
Rise	United Kingdom	The brig ran aground on the Sunk Sank, in the North Sea off the coast of Essex. She was on a voyage from Stockholm, Sweden to London. She was refloated and taken in to Harwich, Essex in a leaky condition.

== Unknown date ==
List of shipwrecks: Unknown date in May 1845
Ship	State	Description
Alfred and Martha	United Kingdom	The ship ran aground on the Insand, in the North Sea off the coast of County Durham before 7 May. She was on a voyage from South Shields, County Durham to Marseille, Bouches-du-Rhône, France. She was refloated on 13 May and resumed her voyage.
Antina	Kingdom of Hanover	The koff was driven ashore near Cuxhaven. She was refloated on 13 May.
Auxiliary	United Kingdom	The ship was abandoned in the Atlantic Ocean before 29 May.
Carlson	United Kingdom	The full-rigged ship was abandoned in the Atlantic Ocean between the Magdalen Islands, Nova Scotia and Prince Edward Island, British North America before 25 May.
Catherine and Isabella	United Kingdom	The ship was driven ashore at Bootle, Cumberland. She was on a voyage from the Clyde to Liverpool, Lancashire. She was refloated on 27 May and taken in to Whitehaven, Cumberland for repairs.
Elizabeth	United Kingdom	The ship sprang a leak in the Atlantic Ocean. She put back to Saint John, New Brunswick, British North America, where she arrived on 31 May in a waterlogged condition. She was consequently condemned.
Hannah	United Kingdom	The brig was wrecked on the African coast before 7 May.
Lord Oakley	United Kingdom	The brig was wrecked near "Chanchell", Algeria.
Mary	(United Kingdom of Great Britain and Ireland) Burma	The schooner was wrecked on Teressa, Nicobar Islands. Her crew survived, but were massacred by the islanders.
Norbolton or Nordpolen	United Kingdom	The ship was driven ashore and severely damaged on the Moor Sands, off the coast of Devon. She was on a voyage from Bahia, Brazil to Cowes, Isle of Wight. She was refloated on 8 May and taken in to Salcombe, Devon where she was condemned.
Odilia	Flag unknown	The brig was abandoned in the Atlantic Ocean before 30 May.
Patterson	(United Kingdom of Great Britain and Ireland) New South Wales	The schooner was wrecked 5 nautical miles (9.3 km) from Nobbys Head before 23 May.
Shamrock	(United Kingdom of Great Britain and Ireland) Van Diemen's Land	The cutter was wrecked on the Tasman Peninsula.
Wardlow	United Kingdom	The ship was driven ashore on Ailsa Craig. She was refloated on 3 May and taken in to Ardrossan, Ayrshire.
