= 155th meridian =

155th meridian may refer to:

- 155th meridian east, a line of longitude east of the Greenwich Meridian
- 155th meridian west, a line of longitude west of the Greenwich Meridian

155th meridian west	155th meridian east
