= 153rd meridian =

153rd meridian may refer to:

- 153rd meridian east, a line of longitude east of the Greenwich Meridian
- 153rd meridian west, a line of longitude west of the Greenwich Meridian

153rd meridian west	153rd meridian east
