= 25th meridian =

25th meridian may refer to:

- 25th meridian east, a line of longitude east of the Greenwich Meridian
- 25th meridian west, a line of longitude west of the Greenwich Meridian
- 25th meridian west from Washington, a line of longitude west of the Washington Meridian
