= 154th meridian =

154th meridian may refer to:

- 154th meridian east, a line of longitude east of the Greenwich Meridian
- 154th meridian west, a line of longitude west of the Greenwich Meridian

154th meridian west	154th meridian east
