= Beyond Thirty and The Man-Eater =

1915 novels by Edgar Rice Burroughs

- First book edition of Beyond Thirty and The Man-Eater
- Author: Edgar Rice Burroughs
- Cover artist: Gil Kane
- Language: English
- Genres: Science fiction
- Publisher: Science-Fiction & Fantasy Publications
- Publication date: 1957
- Publication place: United States
- Media type: Print
- Pages: 229

Beyond Thirty and The Man-Eater is a collection of two short novels by Edgar Rice Burroughs. Both were written in 1915; The Man-Eater, a jungle adventure, was first published as a serial in the New York Evening World newspaper from November 15–20, 1915, while Beyond Thirty, a science fiction story, was first published in All Around Magazine in February 1916. Neither work appeared in book form in Burroughs' lifetime. The first book versions were limited editions were issued by Lloyd Arthur Eshbach's Fantasy Press fanzine in 1955; the two works were then published in a combined edition under the present title by Science-Fiction & Fantasy Publications in 1957, through which they first reached a wide readership. Both works have since been published separately.

== Contents ==
- Beyond Thirty
- The Man-Eater

== Plot summary ==
=== Beyond Thirty ===
The story was heavily influenced by the events of World War I, and reflects U.S. sentiments at the time of writing. When the war broke out, Americans were predominantly isolationist and wary of being drawn into a European war. Burroughs imagines a future two centuries onward in which that view prevailed and the Western Hemisphere severed contact with the rest of the world. Consequently, the Eastern Hemisphere has exhausted itself in war and Europe descended into barbarism while the Americas, sheltered from the destruction, have continued to advance and joined peacefully into the union of Pan-America. By the twenty-second century the entire world east of the 30th meridian west and west of the 175th meridian east has become terra incognita to Pan-America.

In 2137, Pan-American Navy Lieutenant Jefferson Turck is commander of the aero-submarine Coldwater, tasked with patrolling the 30th meridian from Iceland to the Azores. Disaster strikes when the vessel's anti-gravitation screens fail, dooming it to wallow upon the surface of the ocean, and the engines fail, leaving it adrift. As its wireless radio has failed as well, Turck cannot even summon help. It is implied that the perfidy of the Coldwater’s second officer is behind its misfortunes, as well as the abandonment at sea of Turck and three crewmen in a small boat while attempting repairs.

Adrift, Turck and his companions are forced to make shore in forbidden England. Turck falls into the hands of raiders from the Abyssinian Empire, a black super-state ruling all of Africa, most of Europe, and the Arabian Peninsula. While the Abyssinians' technology is roughly equivalent to that of the nineteenth century, the white savages that populate Europe in Turck's time are no match for them. The Abyssinians consider whites a lower order and take them as slaves. Turck too is pressed into slavery. Becoming the personal servant of an Abyssinian colonel he is treated better than many of his fellow slaves, but is rankled by his status.

Turck's master takes him to the court of the Abyssinian Emperor, Menelek XIV. Menelek is portrayed as gross and cruel, perhaps once a great man, but now corrupted by power. Turck watches powerless as white slave women are offered to the emperor for his harem, including the heroine Victory, queen of the primitives of England. Eventually Turck succeeds in rescuing Victory and makes his way with her to the rival empire of China. Communications between the hemispheres are re-opened, with commerce to follow, and Turck, despite violating the edict against crossing the 30th meridian, is hailed as a hero in Pan-America.

=== The Man-Eater ===
Jefferson Scott Jr. and Robert Gordon, hunters in the Belgian Congo, are thrown together with missionaries Sangamon and Mary Morton and their daughter Ruth. Scott marries Ruth, and Gordon is entrusted with stock certificates to be taken back to Scott's father in America. Later Scott and the elder Mortons are killed by the native Wakandas; Ruth and her daughter Virginia are saved by Belgian forces and afterwards return to America to live with Scott's father. The stock certificates, meanwhile, have gone astray, with only a single sheet of paper having been delivered to the elder Scott. Nineteen years pass.

On the death of Jefferson Scott Sr., Virginia Scott is to inherit the estate, but the will cannot be located, and Scott Taylor, her grandfather's disinherited nephew, appears to claim a half share. Proposing to Virginia in an effort to obtain it all, he is rebuffed, whereupon he disputes her right to any of the estate, pretending she is illegitimate. Ruth attempts to prove her marriage to Virginia's father by writing to Robert Gordon, who witnessed the ceremony, but he is now deceased. Her appeal reaches his son Dick Gordon instead. Moved but unable to provide the desired proof, Gordon writes back of his intention to sail to Africa to seek documentation of the marriage there. Taylor intercepts the letter and follows him with the intention of murder. Discovering this, Virginia also sets out for Africa.

Gordon reaches the ruins of the old mission and finds there a sealed envelope, with which he begins his trek back to the coast. Taylor and his confederates Kelley and Gootch await him in ambush in a native village. They kill a lioness, whose mate the natives take captive in a pit trap. Virginia arrives at the village and is imprisoned by the villains. Meanwhile, Gordon discovers and frees the captured lion, which then returns to the village seeking the killers of its mate. The lion arrives just as the villains are about to rape and kill Virginia, and kills Gootch while others flee. Virginia escapes but is stalked by a hyena. Gordon, who happens to be nearby, hears her scream and shoots the beast. She warns him against Taylor, who then appears with Kelley, seeking her. Seizing Gordon's gun, she wounds Taylor and drives the villains off. They return to America and separate, Gordon somehow neglecting to give her the envelope. Meanwhile, the lion has been captured by hunters and sold to an itinerant American circus, in which he is billed as "Ben, King of Beasts, the Man-Eating Lion."

Realizing his omission, Gordon visits the Scott home to deliver the envelope to Virginia and Ruth, unaware that Taylor and Kelley have returned from Africa and still plan to kill him. He finds the Scotts absent from home, their return delayed by a train wreck. Ben, who was also on the train, is freed by the wreck and turns up at the house, where he detects the scents of both his rescuer Gordon and the two villains. Encountering the latter, he kills Kelley and pursues Taylor to Gordons room. There Taylor struggles with Gordon and overcomes him, taking the envelope before fleeing from Ben. The lion follows, overtaking and killing Taylor within sight of the returning Scott's.

Gordon, pursuing Taylor, recognizes Ben and protects him from the armed party that arrives to kill the escaped lion. He buys Ben from the circus, intending to give him a new home in a zoo. The mysterious envelope, finally opened, proves to contain the long lost stocks, not the hoped for marriage certificate. The latter turns up, together with the missing will, in a cupboard in the Scott house, having been secreted there by Jefferson Scott Sr. The certificate was evidently the paper Gordon's father had delivered to the elder Scott instead of the stocks. Dick Gordon and Virginia Scott declare their love for each other and decide to marry.

== Copyright ==
The copyrights for the stories in this collection have expired in the United States and thus now reside in the public domain there.
