= Teleacras =

- Country: Italy
- Broadcast area: Italy

Programming
- Language: Italian
- Picture format: 16:9 576i (SDTV); 1080i (HDTV upscaled)

History
- Launched: 31 December 1975

Links
- Website: Teleacras.it

Availability

Terrestrial
- Free to air (Agrigento): Channel 88

Teleacras is an Italian local television station founded in Agrigento on 31 December 1975. Its name is based on the ancient Greek name of the city, Akragas.

Its news service Videogiornale is directed by Angelo Ruoppolo, while the team includes Gero Micciché and Gloria Scafè.

== History ==
Teleacras launched on 31 December 1975 prior to a 1976 court ordinance liberalizing terrestrial broadcasts, although only at a local level. Its first headquarters were located at Rupe Atenea in Agrigento in the highest point of the city, where the TV antennas were installed. Initially, the station broadcast a black and white signal on UHF channel 29. In 1979, the station was important in the area thanks to its news service, although the technical resources were inadequate for the time.

In 1983, Teleacras received a capital injection and started broadcasting in color. Its Videogiornale was already in color in July of that year. From then on, the station's expansion began, with the installation of relay stations in much of Sicily, covering the entirety of Agrigento, Palermo, Caltanisetta and Enna provinces, and parts of Trapani, Catania, Messina, Ragusa and Siracusa.

The station was awarded the Oscar TV Locali awards (from the Millecanali magazine) in 1994 and 1996, the former for its report Guerra di casa nostra and the latter for Videogiornale.

Teleacras broadcast on satellite for two periods, first from May 2002 (Eutelsat II-F3 21.5°E) to September 2002 and again in the first half of 2004 (Eutelsat II-F3 21.5°E and Hellas Sat 39°E). With the launch of digital terrestrial television, the station broadcasts on channel 88.

In September 2013, Giovani Miccichè, station manager, died at the age of 72. With that, his son Gero Micciché took over as its director..

On 1 January 2017, celebrating the 40th anniversary of regular broadcasts, Teleacras changed its own logo, website style and bumpers, and initiated a schedule catering the youth, trend inaugurated by GameCompass, talk show dedicated to videogames, subsequently becoming a videogame developer.
