= 151st meridian east =

Line of longitude

151st meridian east

The meridian 151° east of Greenwich is a line of longitude that extends from the North Pole across the Arctic Ocean, Asia, the Pacific Ocean, Australasia, the Southern Ocean, and Antarctica to the South Pole.

The 151st meridian east forms a great circle with the 29th meridian west.

== From Pole to Pole ==
Starting at the North Pole and heading south to the South Pole, the 151st meridian east passes through:

Co-ordinates	Country, territory or sea	Notes
90°0′N 151°0′E	Arctic Ocean	
76°50′N 151°0′E	East Siberian Sea	Passing just east of New Siberia Island, Sakha Republic, Russia (at 75°7′N 150°59′E)
71°23′N 151°0′E	Russia	Sakha Republic; Magadan Oblast (Atka) — from 64°20′N 151°0′E
59°34′N 151°0′E	Sea of Okhotsk	Passing between Zavyalov Island and the Koni Peninsula, Magadan Oblast, Russia (at 59°5′N 151°0′E); Passing just east of the Chirpoy islands, Sakhalin Oblast, Russia (at 46°31′N 150°56′E)
46°33′N 151°0′E	Pacific Ocean	
2°42′S 151°0′E	Papua New Guinea	Island of New Ireland
2°48′S 151°0′E	Pacific Ocean	Bismarck Sea
2°57′S 151°0′E	Papua New Guinea	Dyaul Island
2°58′S 151°0′E	Pacific Ocean	Bismarck Sea
5°23′S 151°0′E	Papua New Guinea	Island of New Britain
6°2′S 151°0′E	Solomon Sea	
8°30′S 151°0′E	Papua New Guinea	Island of Kiriwina
8°33′S 151°0′E	Solomon Sea	
9°35′S 151°0′E	Papua New Guinea	Sanaroa Island
9°38′S 151°0′E	Solomon Sea	
9°55′S 151°0′E	Papua New Guinea	Normanby Island
10°7′S 151°0′E	Solomon Sea	
10°16′S 151°0′E	Papua New Guinea	Nuakata Island
10°17′S 151°0′E	Solomon Sea	
10°35′S 151°0′E	Papua New Guinea	Basilaki Island
10°39′S 151°0′E	Coral Sea	Passing through Australia's Coral Sea Islands Territory
23°29′S 151°0′E	Australia	Queensland — Curtis Island and the mainland New South Wales — from 28°44′S 151°0′E, passing through Parramatta (at 33°49′S 151°00′E) in western Sydney
34°14′S 151°0′E	Pacific Ocean	
60°0′S 151°0′E	Southern Ocean	
68°18′S 151°0′E	Antarctica	Australian Antarctic Territory, claimed by Australia

== See also ==
- 150th meridian east
- 152nd meridian east
