= 30th meridian =

30th meridian may refer to:

- 30th meridian east, a line of longitude east of the Greenwich Meridian
- 30th meridian west, a line of longitude west of the Greenwich Meridian
