= 28th meridian west =

Line of longitude

28th meridian west

The meridian 28° west of Greenwich is a line of longitude that extends from the North Pole across the Arctic Ocean, Greenland, the Atlantic Ocean, the Azores, the Southern Ocean, and Antarctica to the South Pole.

The 28th meridian west forms a great circle with the 152nd meridian east.

== From Pole to Pole ==
Starting at the North Pole and heading south to the South Pole, the 28th meridian west passes through:

Co-ordinates	Country, territory or sea	Notes
90°0′N 28°0′W	Arctic Ocean	
83°28′N 28°0′W	Greenland	Moore Glacier (Northern Peary Land)
83°9′N 28°0′W	Frederick E. Hyde Fjord	
83°5′N 28°0′W	Greenland	Melville Land (Southern Peary Land)
82°11′N 28°0′W	Independence Fjord	
82°2′N 28°0′W	Greenland	Mainland, the island of Milne Land and the mainland again
68°35′N 28°0′W	Atlantic Ocean	
39°5′N 28°0′W	Portugal	Island of Graciosa, Azores
39°1′N 28°0′W	Atlantic Ocean	
38°39′N 28°0′W	Portugal	Island of São Jorge, Azores
38°36′N 28°0′W	Atlantic Ocean	Passing just east of Pico Island, Azores, Portugal (at 38°25′N 28°2′W); Passing just east of Leskov Island, South Georgia and the South Sandwich Islands (at 56°40′S 28°9′W)
60°0′S 28°0′W	Southern Ocean	
76°13′S 28°0′W	Antarctica	Claimed by both Argentina (Argentine Antarctica) and United Kingdom (British Antarctic Territory); and the eastern limit of the proposed Brazilian Antarctica, claimed by Brazil

== See also ==
- 27th meridian west
- 29th meridian west
