= 152nd meridian east =

Line of longitude

152nd meridian east

The meridian 152° east of Greenwich is a line of longitude that extends from the North Pole across the Arctic Ocean, Asia, the Pacific Ocean, Australasia, the Southern Ocean, and Antarctica to the South Pole.

The 152nd meridian east forms a great circle with the 28th meridian west.

== From Pole to Pole ==
Starting at the North Pole and heading south to the South Pole, the 152nd meridian east passes through:

Co-ordinates	Country, territory or sea	Notes
90°0′N 152°0′E	Arctic Ocean	
76°53′N 152°0′E	East Siberian Sea	
71°4′N 152°0′E	Russia	Sakha Republic; Magadan Oblast — from 64°29′N 152°0′E
58°53′N 152°0′E	Sea of Okhotsk	
46°58′N 152°0′E	Russia	Sakhalin Oblast — island of Simushir, Kuril Islands
46°53′N 152°0′E	Pacific Ocean	
7°25′N 152°0′E	Federated States of Micronesia	Chuuk Islands
7°13′N 152°0′E	Pacific Ocean	
2°36′S 152°0′E	Papua New Guinea	Tabar islands
2°58′S 152°0′E	Pacific Ocean	
3°14′S 152°0′E	Papua New Guinea	Island of New Ireland
3°26′S 152°0′E	Bismarck Sea	
4°11′S 152°0′E	Papua New Guinea	Island of New Britain
4°59′S 152°0′E	Solomon Sea	
5°12′S 152°0′E	Papua New Guinea	Island of New Britain
5°28′S 152°0′E	Solomon Sea	Passing through the Marshall Bennett Islands, Papua New Guinea (at 9°20′S 152°0′E); Passing through the Louisiade Archipelago, Papua New Guinea (at 10°45′S 152°0′E)
11°16′S 152°0′E	Coral Sea	Passing through Australia's Coral Sea Islands Territory
24°25′S 152°0′E	Australia	Queensland; New South Wales — from 28°32′S 152°0′E; Queensland — from 28°39′S 152°0′E; New South Wales — from 28°54′S 152°0′E
32°48′S 152°0′E	Pacific Ocean	
60°0′S 152°0′E	Southern Ocean	
68°29′S 152°0′E	Antarctica	Australian Antarctic Territory, claimed by Australia

== See also ==
- 151st meridian east
- 153rd meridian east
