= UTC−02:00 =

Time zone

- Time zone
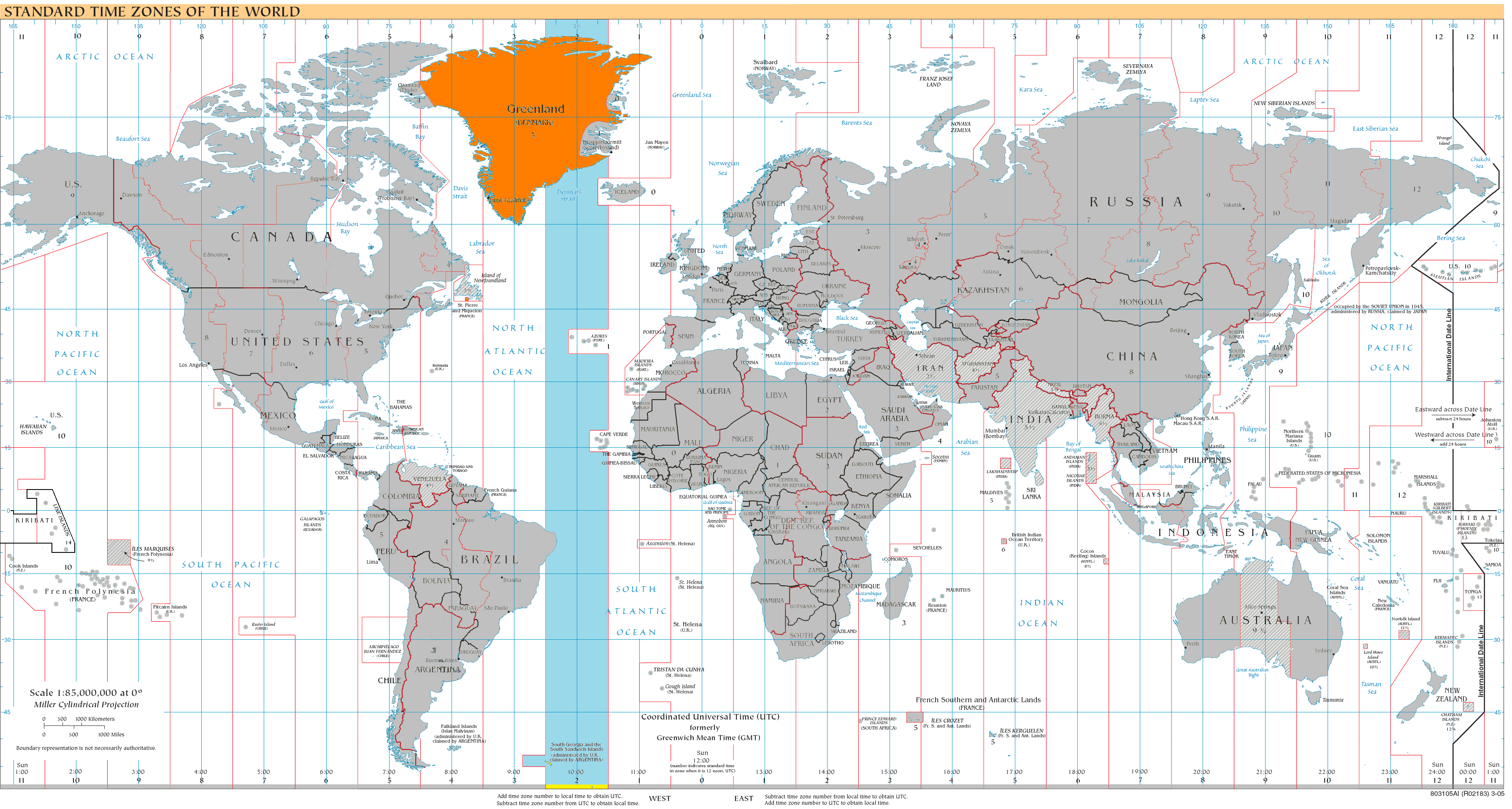
- World map with the time zone highlighted

UTC offset
- UTC: UTC−02:00

Current time
- 22:25, 13 May 2026 UTC−02:00 [refresh]

Central meridian
- 30 degrees W

Date-time group
- O

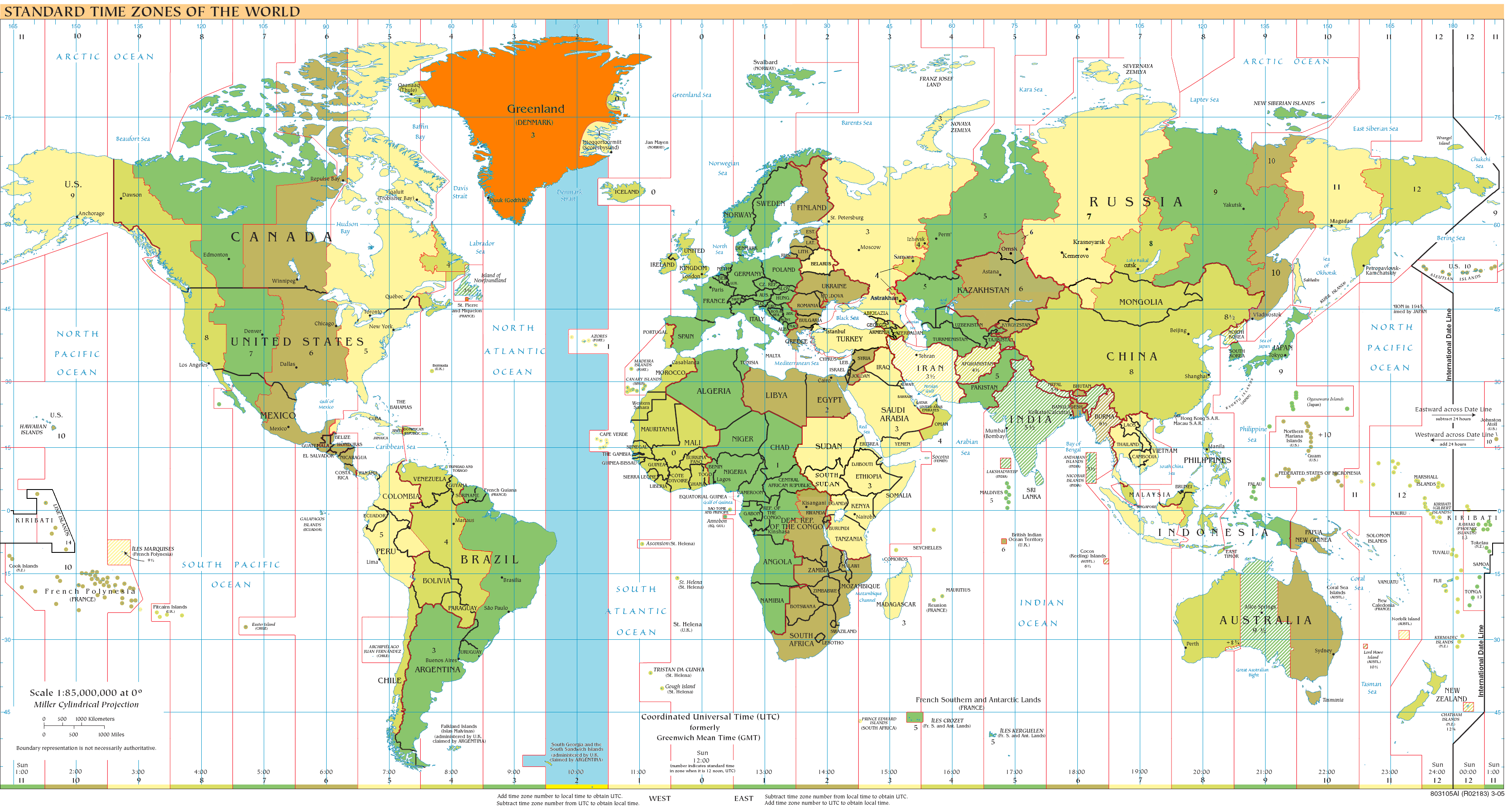
UTC−02:00: orange (July), yellow (year-round), light blue (sea areas)

Time in Brazil, since 25 April 2019. Time in Brazil: ACT / Acre Time / UTC−5 / (BRT–2); AMT / Amazon Time / UTC−4 / (BRT−1); BRT / Brasília Time / UTC−3 / (BRT); FNT / Fernando de Noronha Time / UTC−2 / (BRT+1)

UTC−02:00 is an identifier for a time offset from UTC of −02:00.

== As standard time (Northern Hemisphere winter) ==
=== North America ===
- Greenland
  - Except areas around Danmarkshavn, and Pituffik (Thule)

== As daylight saving time (Northern Hemisphere summer) ==
=== North America ===
- France
  - Saint Pierre and Miquelon

== As standard time (year-round) ==
=== Atlantic Ocean ===
- Brazil
  - Fernando de Noronha
  - Trindade and Martin Vaz
  - Rocas Atoll
  - Saint Peter and Saint Paul Archipelago
- United Kingdom
  - South Georgia and the South Sandwich Islands

== Anomalies ==
=== Regions in UTC−03:00 longitudes using UTC−02:00 time ===
- South Georgia and the South Sandwich Islands (United Kingdom)
  - South Georgia Group
    - The westernmost tip of South Georgia Island
    - Shag Rocks
    - Black Rock

=== Areas in UTC−02:00 longitudes using other time zones ===
==== Using UTC±00:00 ====
- The westernmost part of Iceland, including the northwest peninsula (the Westfjords) and its main town of Ísafjörður, which is west of 22°30′W

==== Using UTC−01:00 ====
- Azores Islands (Portugal)
- Cape Verde

==== Using UTC−03:00 ====
- The easternmost part of Northeast Region, Brazil (includes Recife in UTC−02:19:36)

== See also ==
- Time in Brazil
- Time in Denmark
