= Hellas Sat 3 =

Geostationary communications satellite

Inmarsat S/Hellas Sat 3 is a satellite owned by Hellas Sat. It was launched (on an Ariane 5 rocket) on 28 June 2017, 21:15 UTC to replace the Hellas Sat 2 satellite.
