= Beyond Thirty =

1916 science fiction novel by Edgar Rice Burroughs

- Cover of the first book edition.
- Author: Edgar Rice Burroughs
- Language: English
- Genre: Science fiction
- Publisher: Fantasy Press
- Publication date: 1955
- Publication place: United States
- Media type: Print
- Pages: 57

Beyond Thirty is a short science fiction novel by American writer Edgar Rice Burroughs. It was written in 1915 and first published in All Around Magazine in February 1916, but did not appear in book form in Burroughs' lifetime. The first book edition was issued by Lloyd Arthur Eshbach's Fantasy Press fanzine in 1955; it then appeared in the collection Beyond Thirty and The Man-Eater, published by Science-Fiction & Fantasy Publications in 1957. The work was retitled The Lost Continent for the first mass-market paperback edition, published by Ace Books in October 1963; all subsequent editions bore the new title until the Bison Books edition of March 2001, which restored the original title.

Cover art from the first mass market paperback edition of Beyond Thirty, retitled The Lost Continent, by Edgar Rice Burroughs, Ace Books, 1963. Watercolor by Frank Frazetta.

== Plot ==
The story was heavily influenced by the events of World War I, and reflects U.S. sentiments at the time of writing. When the war broke out, Americans were predominantly isolationist and wary of being drawn into a European war. Burroughs imagines a future two centuries onward in which that view prevailed and the Western Hemisphere severed contact with the rest of the world. Consequently, the Eastern Hemisphere has exhausted itself in war and Europe has descended into barbarism while the Americas, sheltered from the destruction, have continued to advance and joined peacefully into the union of Pan-America. By the twenty-second century, the entire world east of the 30th meridian west and west of the 175th meridian west has become terra incognita to Pan-America.

In 2137, Pan-American Navy Lieutenant Jefferson Turck is commander of the aero-submarine Coldwater, tasked with patrolling the 30th meridian from Iceland to the Azores. Disaster strikes when the vessel's anti-gravitation screens fail, dooming it to wallow upon the surface of the ocean, and the engines fail, leaving it adrift. As its wireless radio has failed as well, Turck cannot even summon help. While the crew attempts repairs Turck and three subordinates, Snider, Taylor and Delcarte, go fishing in a small boat to reprovision the vessel. While they are out the Coldwater is successfully repaired and flies off, leaving the fishermen to their fate. It is implied that Turck's second officer Johnson, who has clashed with his superior, is behind both the original sabotage and subsequent abandonment.

Adrift, Turck and his companions are forced to make shore in forbidden England. They find it a wilderness inhabited by savages and overrun by lions descended from zoo animals. The British royal family has been reduced to the precarious leadership of a small tribe based near the ruins of London. While out hunting Turck rescues Victory, daughter of the king, from the henchmen of Buckingham, a local strongman who has killed her father. He tries to return her to her family, only to fall himself into Buckingham's hands. The two escape and flee to London, where they find evidence that Great Britain had fallen fully two hundred years before; the Great War had destroyed the Old World's civilization in less than a quarter century.

Turck and Victory join the other Americans, and the combined party sails to the European mainland, also reduced to savagery. There Snider dies after attempting to seize Victory for himself. Soon after, Turck and Victory fall separately into the hands of soldiers of the Abyssinian Empire, a black super-state now ruling all of Africa, most of Europe, and the Arabian Peninsula. While the Abyssinians' technology is roughly equivalent to that of the nineteenth century, it is more than a match for the white savages populating Europe. The Abyssinians consider whites a lower order and take them as slaves. Turck too is pressed into slavery, becoming the personal servant of Belik, an Abyssinian colonel.

Turck's master takes him to New Gondar, built on the site of ancient Berlin, where the Abyssinian Emperor, Menelek XIV, holds court. Menelek is portrayed as gross and cruel—perhaps once a great man, but now corrupted by power. Turck watches powerlessly as white slave women are offered to the emperor for his harem, including his love interest Victory. Turck rescues Victory during an attack on New Gondar by the forces of China, which have been advancing into Europe from the east. The couple is captured by the invaders, but made honored guests once the Chinese have heard their story. They are taken to the Chinese base on the site of old Moscow, and eventually by rail to Peking, where the two wed.

Meanwhile, back in Pan-America, Turck's subordinate Alvarez argues for his superior’s rescue, the ban on travel to the Eastern Hemisphere is rescinded, and a search and rescue expedition is mounted. Taylor and Delcarte are found, communications between the hemispheres are re-opened, and diplomatic relations established between Pan-America and China, with commerce to follow. Turck, hailed as a hero, makes plans to restore Victory to her British throne.

== Copyright ==
The copyright for this story has expired in the United States and, thus, now resides in the public domain there.

== See also ==
- List of underwater science fiction works
