= Intelsat V F-7 =

Geostationary communications satellite

Intelsat V F-7 → Intelsat 507
- Mission type: Communication
- Operator: Intelsat
- COSPAR ID: 1983-105A
- SATCAT no.: 14421
- Mission duration: 13 years

Spacecraft properties
- Bus: Intelsat-V bus
- Manufacturer: Ford Aerospace
- Launch mass: 1,928.2 kilograms (4,251 lb)
- BOL mass: 1,012 kilograms (2,231 lb)

Start of mission
- Launch date: October 19, 1983, 00:45:36 UTC
- Rocket: Ariane 1
- Launch site: Kourou ELA-1

End of mission
- Disposal: Decommissioned
- Deactivated: August, 1996

Orbital parameters
- Reference system: Geocentric
- Regime: Geostationary
- Longitude: 149° E (current position)
- Semi-major axis: 42,325 kilometers (26,300 mi)
- Perigee altitude: 35,930.6 kilometers (22,326.2 mi)
- Apogee altitude: 35,978.0 kilometers (22,355.7 mi)
- Inclination: 15.1 degrees
- Period: 1,444.3 minutes
- Epoch: April 23, 2017

Transponders
- Band: 21 C-band; 4 K_{u} band

Intelsat 507, previously named Intelsat V F-7, was a communications satellite operated by Intelsat. Launched in 1983, it was the seventh of fifteen Intelsat V satellites to be launched. The Intelsat V series was constructed by Ford Aerospace, based on the Intelsat-V satellite bus. It was the first satellite of the Intelsat family not to be launched by the United States.

Intelsat V F-67was part of an advanced series of satellites designed to provide greater telecommunications capacity for Intelsat's global network. The satellite was deactivated in August 1996.

The satellite was successfully launched into space on October 19, 1983, at 00:45 UTC, by means of an Ariane 1 vehicle from the Guiana Space Centre, Kourou, French Guiana. It had a launch mass of 1,928 kg. The Intelsat 507 was equipped with 4 Ku-band transponders more 21 C-band transponders for 12,000 audio circuits and 2 TV channels.
