= Intelsat III F-6 =

Communications satellite

- Mission type: Communications
- Operator: Intelsat
- COSPAR ID: 1970-003A
- SATCAT no.: 04297
- Mission duration: 5 years (planned)

Spacecraft properties
- Manufacturer: TRW Inc.
- Launch mass: 293 kilograms (646 lb)
- BOL mass: 151 kilograms (333 lb)
- Power: 183 W

Start of mission
- Launch date: January 15, 1970, 00:16:03 UTC
- Rocket: Delta M
- Launch site: Cape Canaveral LC-17A

Orbital parameters
- Reference system: Geocentric
- Regime: Geostationary
- Eccentricity: 0.00033
- Perigee altitude: 35,773 kilometers (22,228 mi)
- Apogee altitude: 35,801 kilometers (22,246 mi)
- Inclination: 0.9°
- Period: 1,436.1 minutes
- Epoch: January 15, 1970

Intelsat III F-6 was a communications satellite owned by Intelsat. The satellite had an estimated useful life of 5 years.

== Design ==
The sixth of eight Intelsat III satellites to be launched, Intelsat III F-6 was built by TRW. It was a 293-kilogram (646 lb) spacecraft equipped with two transponders to be powered by body-mounted solar cells generating 183 watts of power. It had a design life of five years and carried an SVM-2 apogee motor for propulsion.

== Launch ==
Intelsat III F-6 was launched on a Delta M rocket, flying from Launch Complex 17A at the Cape Canaveral Air Force Station. The launch took place on January 15, 1970, with the spacecraft bound for a geosynchronous transfer orbit.

== See also ==
- 1970 in spaceflight
