= The Man-Eater =

Novel by Edgar Rice Burroughs

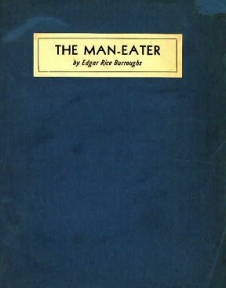
- Cover art from first edition
- Author: Edgar Rice Burroughs
- Language: English
- Genre: Adventure
- Publisher: Fantasy Press
- Publication date: 1955
- Publication place: United States
- Media type: Print (Paperback)

The Man-Eater is a short adventure novel by American writer Edgar Rice Burroughs, written in May 1915, originally as a movie treatment. His working title for the piece was Ben, King of Beasts. The Man-Eater is one of Burrough's rarer works. It was first published as a serial in the New York Evening World newspaper under the present title from November 15–20, 1915, but did not appear in book form in Burroughs' lifetime. The first book edition was issued by Lloyd Arthur Eshbach's Fantasy Press fanzine in 1955; it then appeared in the collection Beyond Thirty and The Man-Eater, published by Science-Fiction & Fantasy Publications in 1957. It was reprinted in paperback (without the hyphen in the title) as The Man Eater: Ben, King of Beasts by Fantasy House in 1974.

== Plot ==
Jefferson Scott Jr. and Robert Gordon, hunters in the Belgian Congo, are thrown together with missionaries Sangamon and Mary Morton and their daughter Ruth. Scott marries Ruth, and Gordon is entrusted with stock certificates to be taken back to Scott's father in America. Later Scott and the elder Mortons are killed by the native Wakandas; Ruth and her daughter Virginia are saved by Belgian forces and afterwards return to America to live with Scott's father. The stock certificates, meanwhile, have gone astray, with only a single sheet of paper having been delivered to the elder Scott. 19 years pass.

On the death of Jefferson Scott Sr., Virginia Scott is to inherit the estate, but the will cannot be located, and Scott Taylor, her grandfather’s disinherited nephew, appears to claim a half-share. Proposing to Virginia in an effort to obtain it all, he is rebuffed, whereupon he disputes her right to any of the estate, pretending she is illegitimate. Ruth attempts to prove her marriage to Virginia's father by writing to Robert Gordon, who witnessed the ceremony, but he is now deceased. Her appeal reaches his son Dick Gordon instead. Moved but unable to provide the desired proof, Gordon writes back of his intention to sail to Africa to seek documentation of the marriage there. Taylor intercepts the letter and follows him with the intention of murder. Discovering this, Virginia also sets out for Africa.

Gordon reaches the ruins of the old mission and finds there a sealed envelope, with which he begins his trek back to the coast. Taylor and his confederates Kelley and Gootch await him in ambush in a native village. They kill a lioness, whose mate the natives take captive in a pit trap. Virginia arrives at the village and is imprisoned by the villains. Meanwhile, Gordon discovers and frees the captured lion, which then returns to the village seeking the killers of its mate. The lion arrives just as the villains are about to rape and kill Virginia, and kills Gootch while others flee. Virginia escapes but is stalked by a hyena. Gordon, who happens to be nearby, hears her scream and shoots the beast. She warns him against Taylor, who then appears with Kelley, seeking her. Seizing Gordon’s gun, she wounds Taylor and drives the villains off. They return to America and separate, Gordon somehow neglecting to give her the envelope. Meanwhile, the lion has been captured by hunters and sold to an itinerant American circus, in which he is billed as "Ben, King of Beasts, the Man-Eating Lion".

Realizing his omission, Gordon visits the Scott home to deliver the envelope to Virginia and Ruth, unaware that Taylor and Kelley have returned from Africa and still plan to kill him. He finds the Scotts absent from home, their return delayed by a train wreck. Ben, who was also on the train, is freed by the wreck and turns up at the house, where he detects the scents of both his rescuer Gordon and the two villains. Encountering the latter, he kills Kelley and pursues Taylor to Gordon's room. There Taylor struggles with Gordon and overcomes him, taking the envelope before fleeing from Ben. The lion follows, overtaking and killing Taylor within sight of the returning Scotts.

Gordon, pursuing Taylor, recognizes Ben and protects him from the armed party that arrives to kill the escaped lion. He buys Ben from the circus, intending to give him a new home in a zoo. The mysterious envelope, finally opened, proves to contain the long-lost stocks, not the hoped-for marriage certificate. The latter turns up, together with the missing will, in a cupboard in the Scott house, having been secreted there by Jefferson Scott Sr. The certificate was evidently the paper Gordon's father had delivered to the elder Scott instead of the stocks. Dick Gordon and Virginia Scott declare their love for each other and decide to marry.

== Copyright ==
The copyright for this story has expired in the United States and, thus, now resides in the public domain there.
