= ʼAuhelawa language =

Austronesian language spoken in Nuakata Island

ʼAuhelawa
- Kurada
- Native to: Milne Bay Province, Papua New Guinea
- Region: Nuakata Island
- Native speakers: 950 (2015)
- Language family: Austronesian: Malayo-Polynesian; Oceanic; Western; Papuan Tip; Nuclear; Suauic; ʼAuhelawa
- Writing system: Latin

Language codes
- ISO 639-3: kud
- Glottolog: auhe1237

ʼAuhelawa is an Austronesian language found in Nuakata Island and the southeastern tip of Normanby Island in Milne Bay Province, Papua New Guinea. It was spoken by about 1,200 people in 1998, 30% of whom were monolingual in the language.

The literacy rate for first-language speakers is 85%, and is also 85% for second-language users. There are translated Bible portions into the language from 1986–1993.

== ʼAuhelawa examples ==
A: Auge, yauwedo. Haidova u lalau? ('My friend, hello. Where are you going?')

B: Ya lalau oyai. Yagu oya vauvauna ya tudai. Owa haidova u lau? ('I am going to the garden. I dig my new garden. Where did you go?')

A: Ya dobi gogowai yada bada ehebo ya ita. Teina gona sabate mata yana vada vauvauna ya abi. ('I went down to the village to see one of our uncles. Next week I will build his new house.')

B: Yau dova nuwanuwagu yada bada ya hagui. Ebe u dobi u vada abi, u lauma u vaigau ta dobi ta paihowa. ('I also want to help our uncle. When you go down to housebuild, you come and get me and we go down and work.')

A: Ausala. Mata ta itago. ('Good. We will see you.')

== Phonology ==
=== Vowels ===
Vowels
| | Front | Back |
|---|---|---|
| High | i | u |
| Mid | ɛ | ɔ |
| Low | a | |

=== Consonants ===
Consonants
| | | Bilabial | | Alveolar | Palatal | Velar | | Glottal | |
| | | plain | round | Alveolar | Palatal | plain | round | plain | round |
|---|---|---|---|---|---|---|---|---|---|
| Nasal | | m | mʷ | n | | | | | |
| Stop | voiceless | p | pʷ | t | | | | ʔ | ʔʷ |
| Stop | voiced | b | bʷ | d | | ɡ | ɡʷ | | |
| Fricative | | β | | s | | | | h | |
| Approximant | | w | | l | j | | | | |

- /k/ occurs only in loanwords.

== Writing system ==
ʼAuhelawa is written in the Latin script. About 85% of the population is literate.

Orthography
| A a | B b | Bw bw | D d | E e | G g | Gw gw | H h | I i | K k | L l | M m | Mw mw |
|---|---|---|---|---|---|---|---|---|---|---|---|---|
| /a/ | /b/ | /bʷ/ | /d/ | /ɛ/ | /ɡ/ | /ɡʷ/ | /h/ | /i/ | /k/ | /l/ | /m/ | /mʷ/ |
| N n | O o | P p | Pw pw | S s | T t | U u | V v | W w | Y y | ʼ | ʼW ʼw | |
| /n/ | /ɔ/ | /p/ | /pʷ/ | /s/ | /t/ | /u/ | /β/ | /ɥ/ | /j/ | /ʔ/ | /ʔʷ/ | |
