= Hellas Sat 2 =

Geosynchronous communications satellite

- Mission type: Communications
- Operator: Hellas Sat
- COSPAR ID: 2003-020A
- SATCAT no.: 27811
- Website: https://www.hellas-sat.net/homepage
- Mission duration: 15 years (planned)

Spacecraft properties
- Spacecraft type: Eurostar
- Bus: Eurostar 2000+
- Manufacturer: EADS Astrium
- Launch mass: 3450 kg
- Dimensions: 3.19 x 3.48 x 7.89 m
- Power: 7.6 kW

Start of mission
- Launch date: 13 May 2003, 22:10:00 UTC
- Rocket: Atlas V 401
- Launch site: Cape Canaveral, SLC-41
- Contractor: Lockheed Martin

Orbital parameters
- Reference system: Geocentric orbit
- Regime: Geostationary orbit
- Longitude: 39.0° East

Transponders
- Band: 30 Ku-band
- Frequency: Uplink: 13.75-14 GHz / 14-14.25 GHz / 14.25-14.5 GHz; Downlink: 12.5-12.75 GHz / 10.95-11.2 GHz / 11.45-11.7 GHz
- Bandwidth: 36 MHz
- Coverage area: Africa, Middle East, Europe

Hellas Sat 2 (previously called as Intelsat K-TV, NSS K-TV, NSS 6, Intelsat APR3, and Sinosat 1B) is a communications satellite operated by Hellas Sat. On 29 June 2017, the Hellas Sat 3 satellite was launched to replace the Hellas Sat 2.

== Launch ==
Hellas Sat 2 was launched by an Atlas V 401 rocket from Cape Canaveral Air Force Station, SLC-41, Florida, United States, at 22:10:00 UTC on 13 May 2003.

== Capacity and coverage ==
The 3450 kg satellite carries 30 Ku-band transponders to provide direct-to-home voice and video transmissions to much of Europe, North Africa and the Middle East, after parking over 39.0° East longitude. Also provided television broadcasting services for the 2004 Summer Olympic Games in Athens, Greece.
