= Spectacle Island (Maine) =

Island in Hancock County, Maine, United States

Coordinates: 44°22′04″N 68°06′01″W

Spectacle Island is a privately owned island off Bar Harbor, Maine, United States. It is 4 acres (1.6 ha), and it is owned by Ashley Longmaid. As of 2012, it is the world's ninth most expensive island and is part of the Town of Winter Harbor.
