= Intelsat 903 =

Geostationary communications satellite

- Mission type: Communications
- Operator: Intelsat
- COSPAR ID: 2002-016A
- SATCAT no.: 27403
- Mission duration: 13 years

Spacecraft properties
- Spacecraft type: SSL-1300HL
- Manufacturer: Space Systems/Loral
- Launch mass: 4,723.0 kg (10,412.4 lb)
- Dry mass: 1,972.0 kg (4,347.5 lb)
- Power: 8.6 kW

Start of mission
- Launch date: March 30, 2002, 17:25 UTC
- Rocket: Proton-K Blok-DM3
- Launch site: Baikonur 81/23

Orbital parameters
- Reference system: Geocentric
- Regime: Geostationary
- Longitude: 34.5° west
- Semi-major axis: 42,164.0 kilometres (26,199.5 mi)
- Eccentricity: 0.0003243
- Perigee altitude: 35,780.2 kilometres (22,232.8 mi)
- Apogee altitude: 35,807.6 kilometres (22,249.8 mi)
- Inclination: 0.0122°
- Period: 1,436.1 minutes
- RAAN: 301.1223°
- Epoch: May 19, 2017
- Revolution no.: 1241

Transponders
- Band: 44 C band and 12 K_{u} band
- Bandwidth: 36 MHz and 72 MHz
- Coverage area: Africa, America, Europe, Middle East
- EIRP: 36 dBW (C Band) 53 dBW (K_{u} band Europe) and 52 dBW (K_{u} band America)

Intelsat 903 (or IS-903) is a communications satellite operated by Intelsat.

== Launch ==
Intelsat 903 was launched by a Proton-K rocket from Baikonur Cosmodrome, Kazakhstan, at 22:27 UTC on March 30, 2002.

== Capacity and coverage ==
The 4.7 tonne (with fuel) spacecraft carries 23 C-band transponders (and several in Ku-band) to provide direct-to-home television and internet service to Europe and North America after parking over 34.5 degrees west longitude.

== See also ==
- 2002 in spaceflight
