= 27th meridian east =

Line of longitude

27th meridian east (interactive map)

The meridian 27° east of Greenwich is a line of longitude that extends from the North Pole across the Arctic Ocean, Europe, Asia, Africa, the Indian Ocean, the Southern Ocean, and Antarctica to the South Pole.

The 27th meridian east forms a great circle with the 153rd meridian west.

== From Pole to Pole ==
Starting at the North Pole and heading south to the South Pole, the 27th meridian east passes through:

Co-ordinates	Country, territory or sea	Notes
90°0′N 27°0′E	Arctic Ocean	
80°6′N 27°0′E	Norway	Island of Nordaustlandet, Svalbard
79°52′N 27°0′E	Barents Sea	
78°42′N 27°0′E	Norway	Island of Svenskøya, Svalbard
78°41′N 27°0′E	Barents Sea	
70°36′N 27°0′E	Norway	
69°55′N 27°0′E	Finland	
60°25′N 27°0′E	Baltic Sea	Gulf of Finland
60°4′N 27°0′E	Russia	Leningrad Oblast — island of Gogland
60°1′N 27°0′E	Baltic Sea	Gulf of Finland
59°26′N 27°0′E	Estonia	Passing through Lake Peipus
57°37′N 27°0′E	Latvia	
55°49′N 27°0′E	Belarus	
51°47′N 27°0′E	Ukraine	
49°25′N 27°0′E	Ukraine	Khmelnytskyi Oblast - Passing through Khmelnytskyi
48°22′N 27°0′E	Moldova	
48°8′N 27°0′E	Romania	
44°8′N 27°0′E	Bulgaria	
42°2′N 27°0′E	Turkey	165 km. Thrace
40°34′N 27°0′E	Sea of Marmara	16 km.
40°23′N 27°0′E	Turkey	257 km. Anatolia
38°4′N 27°0′E	Mediterranean Sea	Aegean Sea
37°47′N 27°0′E	Greece	Island of Samos
37°42′N 27°0′E	Mediterranean Sea	Aegean Sea
37°28′N 27°0′E	Greece	Island of Agathonisi
37°27′N 27°0′E	Mediterranean Sea	Aegean Sea
37°1′N 27°0′E	Greece	Island of Kalymnos
36°57′N 27°0′E	Mediterranean Sea	Aegean Sea
36°47′N 27°0′E	Greece	Island of Kos
36°45′N 27°0′E	Mediterranean Sea	Aegean Sea
35°26′N 27°0′E	Greece	Island of Kasos
35°24′N 27°0′E	Mediterranean Sea	
31°26′N 27°0′E	Egypt	
22°0′N 27°0′E	Sudan	
9°35′N 27°0′E	South Sudan	
5°51′N 27°0′E	Central African Republic	
5°10′N 27°0′E	Democratic Republic of the Congo	
11°51′S 27°0′E	Zambia	
17°57′S 27°0′E	Zimbabwe	
20°1′S 27°0′E	Botswana	
23°41′S 27°0′E	South Africa	Limpopo; North West; Free State; Eastern Cape
33°35′S 27°0′E	Indian Ocean	
60°0′S 27°0′E	Southern Ocean	
69°58′S 27°0′E	Antarctica	Queen Maud Land, claimed by Norway

== See also ==
- 26th meridian east
- 28th meridian east
