= 153rd meridian east =

Line of longitude

153rd meridian east

The meridian 153° east of Greenwich is a line of longitude that extends from the North Pole across the Arctic Ocean, Asia, the Pacific Ocean, Australasia, the Southern Ocean, and Antarctica to the South Pole.

The 153rd meridian east forms a great circle with the 27th meridian west.

== From Pole to Pole ==
Starting at the North Pole and heading south to the South Pole, the 153rd meridian east passes through:

| Co-ordinates | Country, territory or sea | Notes |
|---|---|---|
| 90°0′N 153°0′E | Arctic Ocean | |
| 76°56′N 153°0′E | East Siberian Sea | Passing just east of Zhokhov Island, Sakha Republic, Russia (at 76°10′N 152°57′E) |
| 70°49′N 153°0′E | Russia | Sakha Republic; Magadan Oblast — from 65°15′N 153°0′E |
| 59°3′N 153°0′E | Sea of Okhotsk | |
| 47°46′N 153°0′E | Russia | Sakhalin Oblast — island of Rasshua, Kuril Islands |
| 47°41′N 153°0′E | Pacific Ocean | Passing just west of the Tanga Islands, Papua New Guinea (at 3°30′S 153°10′E) |
| 4°6′S 153°0′E | Papua New Guinea | Island of New Ireland |
| 4°41′S 153°0′E | Solomon Sea | |
| 9°9′S 153°0′E | Papua New Guinea | Woodlark Island |
| 9°10′S 153°0′E | Solomon Sea | Passing just east of Misima Island, Papua New Guinea (at 10°40′S 152°52′E) |
| 11°9′S 153°0′E | Papua New Guinea | Panawina Island in the Louisiade Archipelago |
| 11°37′S 153°0′E | Coral Sea | Passing through Australia's Coral Sea Islands Territory |
| 25°26′S 153°0′E | Australia | Queensland — Fraser Island and mainland, passing through Brisbane (at 27°28′S 153°0′E); New South Wales — from 28°21′S 153°0′E |
| 31°9′S 153°0′E | Pacific Ocean | |
| 60°0′S 153°0′E | Southern Ocean | |
| 68°26′S 153°0′E | Antarctica | Australian Antarctic Territory, claimed by Australia |

== See also ==
- 152nd meridian east
- 154th meridian east
