= Intelsat III F-1 =

Geostationary communications satellite

- Mission type: Communications
- Operator: Intelsat
- COSPAR ID: INT3F-1
- Mission duration: 5 years planned Failed to orbit

Spacecraft properties
- Spacecraft type: Intelsat III
- Manufacturer: TRW
- Launch mass: 293 kilograms (646 lb)
- Power: 183 watts

Start of mission
- Launch date: September 19, 1968, 00:09:00 UTC
- Rocket: Delta M
- Launch site: Cape Canaveral LC-17A
- Contractor: NASA

Orbital parameters
- Reference system: Geocentric
- Regime: Geosynchronous
- Epoch: Planned

Intelsat III F-1 was a communications satellite intended to be operated by Intelsat. Launched towards geostationary orbit in 1968 it failed to achieve orbit.

== Design ==
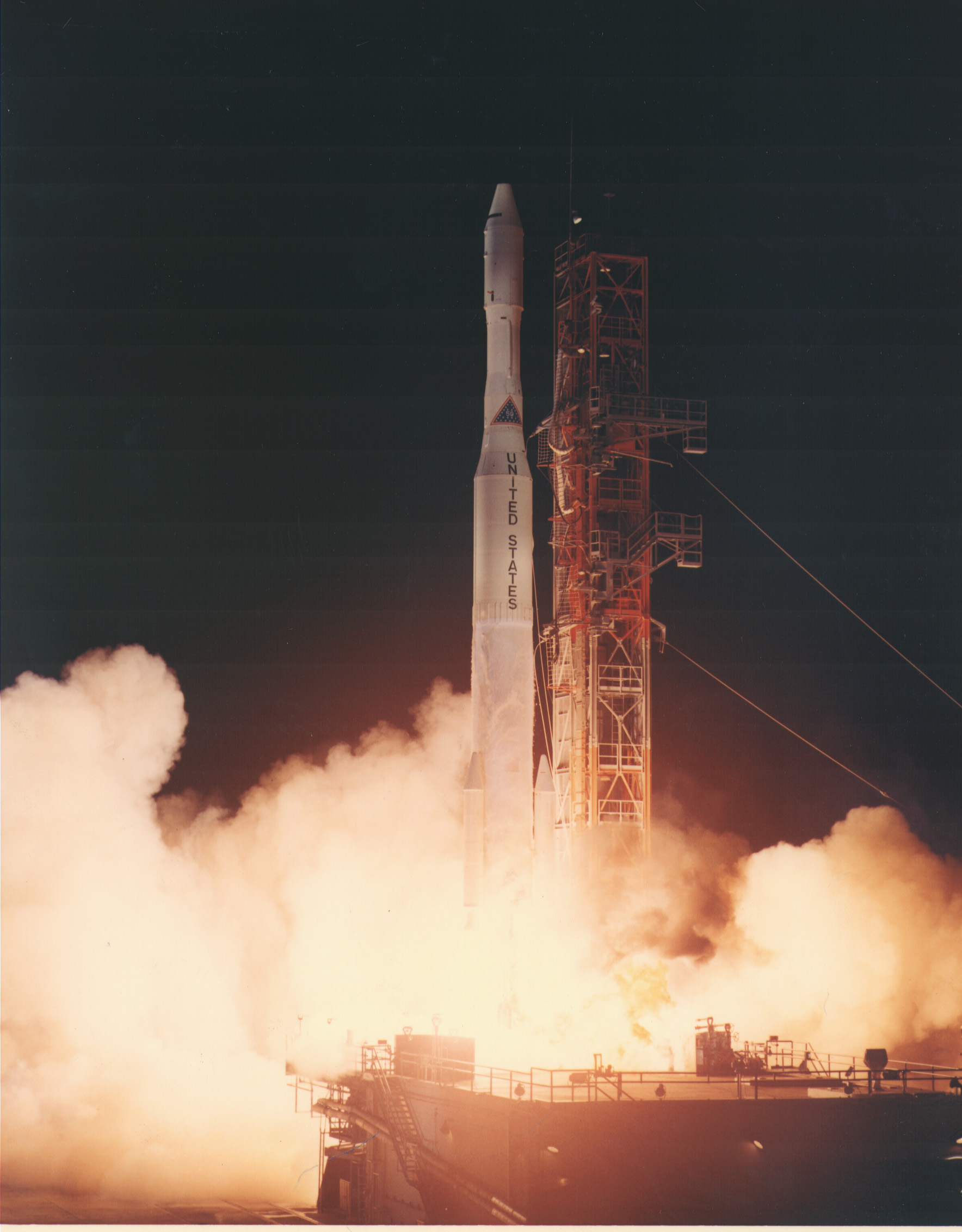
Launch of Intelsat III F-1.

The first of eight Intelsat III satellites to be launched, Intelsat III F-1 was built by TRW. It was a 293-kilogram (646 lb) spacecraft equipped with two transponders to be powered by body-mounted solar cells generating 183 watts of power. It had a design life of five years and carried an SVM-2 apogee motor for propulsion.

== Launch ==
Intelsat III F-1 was launched on the maiden flight of the Delta M rocket, flying from Launch Complex 17A at the Cape Canaveral Air Force Station. The launch took place at 00:09:00 UTC on September 19, 1968, with the spacecraft bound for a geosynchronous transfer orbit.

It was to go in operation above the Atlantic Ocean in time to relay broadcasts of the next month's Olympics in Mexico City.

Twenty seconds after liftoff a fault became apparent in the gyroscope used to monitor the rate at which the rocket pitched over. Control of the rocket was subsequently lost, with it beginning to disintegrate around 102 seconds into the flight. At 108 seconds after launch the rocket was destroyed by range safety.

== See also ==
- 1968 in spaceflight
