= 26th meridian west =

Line of longitude

26th meridian west

The meridian 26° west of Greenwich is a line of longitude that extends from the North Pole across the Arctic Ocean, Greenland, the Atlantic Ocean, the Southern Ocean, and Antarctica to the South Pole.

The 26th meridian west forms a great circle with the 154th meridian east.

== From Pole to Pole ==
Starting at the North Pole and heading south to the South Pole, the 26th meridian west passes through:

The line is historically important because on 18 April 1941 the United States government used it as the demarcation between the Western and Eastern Hemispheres for the period of hostilities leading up to its participation in the Second World War. This influenced Britain's proposed occupation of the Canary Islands in its planned (but never executed) Operation Pilgrim. After the war began the boundary was moved to the 35th meridian west for purposes of service, as specified in the American Campaign Medal.

Co-ordinates	Country, territory or sea	Notes
90°0′N 26°0′W	Arctic Ocean	
83°21′N 26°0′W	Greenland	Northern Peary Land
83°14′N 26°0′W	Frederick E. Hyde Fjord	
83°8′N 26°0′W	Greenland	Southern Peary Land
82°10′N 26°0′W	Independence Fjord	
82°1′N 26°0′W	Greenland	
81°36′N 26°0′W	Hagen Fjord	
81°29′N 26°0′W	Greenland	Mainland and the island of Milne Land
70°32′N 26°0′W	Scoresby Sund	
70°16′N 26°0′W	Greenland	
68°47′N 26°0′W	Atlantic Ocean	Passing just west of São Miguel Island, Azores, Portugal (at 37°51′N 25°51′W); Passing just east of Saunders Island, South Georgia and the South Sandwich Islands (at 57°47′S 26°20′W); Passing just east of Montagu Island, South Georgia and the South Sandwich Islands (at 58°28′S 26°13′W)
60°0′S 26°0′W	Southern Ocean	
75°23′S 26°0′W	Antarctica	Claimed by both Argentina (Argentine Antarctica) and United Kingdom (British Antarctic Territory)

== See also ==
- 25th meridian west
- 27th meridian west
