= Amazonas Nexus =

Hispasat telecommunications satellite

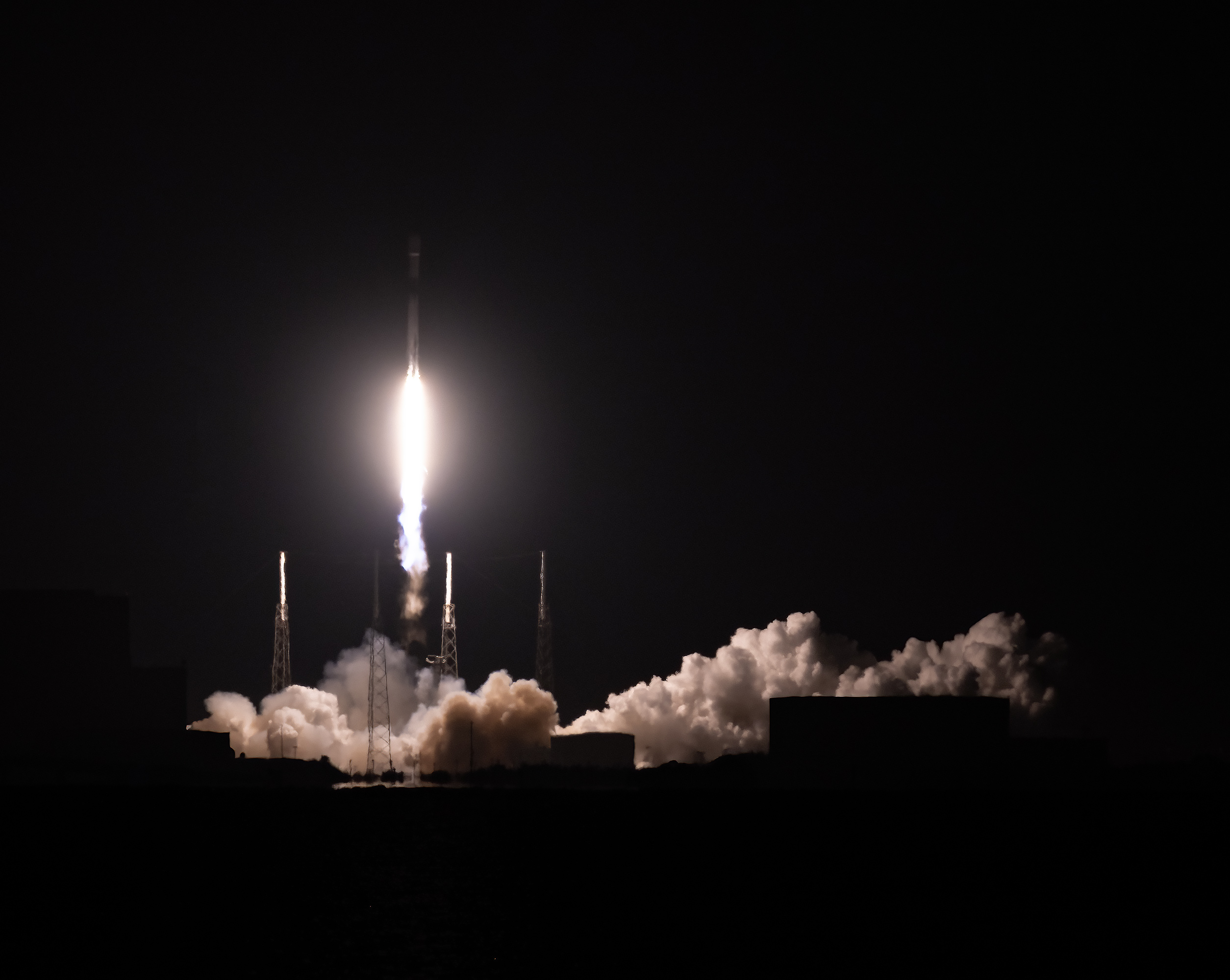
- Amazonas Nexus launch on Falcon 9
- Mission type: Communication
- Operator: Hispasat
- COSPAR ID: 2023-017A
- SATCAT no.: 55508
- Mission duration: 15 years (planned)

Spacecraft properties
- Spacecraft type: SB NEO 200
- Bus: Spacebus NEO
- Manufacturer: Thales Alenia Space
- Launch mass: 4500 kg

Start of mission
- Launch date: 7 February 2023, 01:32 UTC
- Rocket: Falcon 9 Block 5
- Launch site: Cape Canaveral, SLC-40
- Contractor: SpaceX

Orbital parameters
- Reference system: Geocentric orbit
- Regime: Geostationary orbit

Amazonas Nexus (also known as Intelsat 46e) is a geostationary high-throughput satellite (HTS) owned and operated by the Spanish satellite operator Hispasat. Built by Thales Alenia Space on the Spacebus-Neo-200 platform, it provides broadband connectivity across the Americas, Greenland, and Atlantic air and maritime corridors. Launched in 2023, it replaces and expands upon the capabilities of the earlier Amazonas 2 satellite, incorporating advanced digital processing for flexible capacity allocation.

== Launch ==
Amazonas Nexus launched on 7 February 2023 (01:32 UTC) aboard a SpaceX Falcon 9 Block 5 rocket from SLC-40 at Cape Canaveral Space Force Station in Florida. The first-stage booster B1073 landed successfully on a droneship.

== Operations ==
The satellite reached geostationary orbit at 61° West and entered commercial service in July 2023 after in-orbit testing. Hispasat has leased significant capacity, including to Intelsat for pan-American services and to partners for aviation and governmental use. Over 60% of capacity was pre-leased before full operations.
