= 25th meridian east =

Line of longitude

25th meridian east (interactive map)

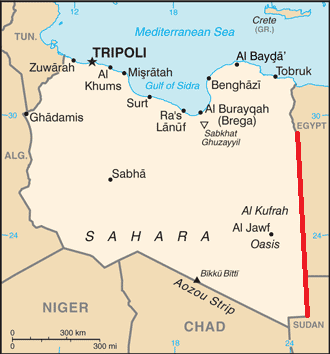
The 25th meridian east delineates most of Libya's eastern border with Egypt and Sudan

The meridian 25° east of Greenwich is a line of longitude that extends from the North Pole across the Arctic Ocean, Europe, Africa, the Indian Ocean, the Southern Ocean, and Antarctica to the South Pole.

The 25th meridian east forms a great circle with the 155th meridian west.

Most of the border between Libya and Egypt is defined by the meridian, as is much of the border between Libya and Sudan.

== From Pole to Pole ==
Starting at the North Pole and heading south to the South Pole, the 25th meridian east passes through:

| Co-ordinates | Country, territory or sea | Notes |
|---|---|---|
| 90°0′N 25°0′E | Arctic Ocean | |
| 80°15′N 25°0′E | Norway | Island of Nordaustlandet, Svalbard |
| 79°20′N 25°0′E | Barents Sea | |
| 76°29′N 25°0′E | Norway | Island of Hopen, Svalbard |
| 76°26′N 25°0′E | Barents Sea | |
| 71°2′N 25°0′E | Norway | |
| 68°37′N 25°0′E | Finland | |
| 65°38′N 25°0′E | Baltic Sea | Gulf of Bothnia |
| 65°3′N 25°0′E | Finland | Island of Hailuoto |
| 65°2′N 25°0′E | Baltic Sea | Gulf of Bothnia |
| 64°55′N 25°0′E | Finland | Passing through Helsinki |
| 60°10′N 25°0′E | Baltic Sea | Gulf of Finland |
| 59°39′N 25°0′E | Estonia | Island of Prangli |
| 59°37′N 25°0′E | Baltic Sea | Gulf of Finland |
| 59°29′N 25°0′E | Estonia | Passing just east of Tallinn |
| 58°0′N 25°0′E | Latvia | |
| 56°18′N 25°0′E | Lithuania | Passing just west of Vilnius |
| 54°9′N 25°0′E | Belarus | |
| 51°55′N 25°0′E | Ukraine | Volyn Oblast — passing just west of Lutsk; Lviv Oblast — passing just east of Zolochiv; Ternopil Oblast — passing just east of Berezhany; Ivano-Frankivsk Oblast — passing through Kolomyia; Chernivtsi Oblast |
| 47°44′N 25°0′E | Romania | |
| 43°44′N 25°0′E | Bulgaria | |
| 41°23′N 25°0′E | Greece | |
| 40°57′N 25°0′E | Mediterranean Sea | Aegean Sea - passing just west of the island of Lemnos, Greece |
| 39°33′N 25°0′E | Greece | Island of Agios Efstratios |
| 39°29′N 25°0′E | Mediterranean Sea | Aegean Sea |
| 37°46′N 25°0′E | Greece | Just passing through the easternmost point of the island of Andros |
| 37°46′N 25°0′E | Mediterranean Sea | Aegean Sea |
| 37°40′N 25°0′E | Greece | Island of Tinos |
| 37°38′N 25°0′E | Mediterranean Sea | Aegean Sea - passing just east of the island of Syros, Greece |
| 36°59′N 25°0′E | Greece | Island of Despotiko |
| 36°57′N 25°0′E | Mediterranean Sea | Aegean Sea; Passing between the islands of Folegandros and Sikinos, Greece |
| 36°36′N 25°0′E | Mediterranean Sea | Sea of Crete |
| 35°25′N 25°0′E | Greece | Island of Crete |
| 34°56′N 25°0′E | Mediterranean Sea | |
| 31°57′N 25°0′E | Libya | |
| 31°30′N 25°0′E | Egypt | |
| 30°50′N 25°0′E | Libya | For about 12 km |
| 30°44′N 25°0′E | Egypt | |
| 29°15′N 25°0′E | Libya / Egypt border | |
| 22°0′N 25°0′E | Libya / Sudan border | |
| 20°0′N 25°0′E | Sudan | |
| 9°58′N 25°0′E | South Sudan | |
| 7°58′N 25°0′E | Central African Republic | |
| 5°0′N 25°0′E | Democratic Republic of the Congo | |
| 11°15′S 25°0′E | Zambia | |
| 17°36′S 25°0′E | Namibia | Caprivi Strip |
| 17°43′S 25°0′E | Botswana | Passing through the Makgadikgadi Pan |
| 25°45′S 25°0′E | South Africa | North West; Northern Cape - for about 8 km North West; Northern Cape - for about 8 km Free State; Northern Cape; Eastern Cape |
| 33°59′S 25°0′E | Indian Ocean | |
| 60°0′S 25°0′E | Southern Ocean | |
| 70°7′S 25°0′E | Antarctica | Queen Maud Land, claimed by Norway |

== See also ==
- 24th meridian east
- 26th meridian east
