= 154th meridian east =

Line of longitude

154th meridian east

The meridian 154° east of Greenwich is a line of longitude that extends from the North Pole across the Arctic Ocean, Asia, the Pacific Ocean, Australasia, the Southern Ocean, and Antarctica to the South Pole.

The 154th meridian east forms a great circle with the 26th meridian west.

== From Pole to Pole ==
Starting at the North Pole and heading south to the South Pole, the 154th meridian east passes through:

Co-ordinates	Country, territory or sea	Notes
90°0′N 154°0′E	Arctic Ocean	
76°56′N 154°0′E	East Siberian Sea	
70°54′N 154°0′E	Russia	Sakha Republic (Yukaghir Highlands); Magadan Oblast — from 65°52′N 154°0′E
59°4′N 154°0′E	Sea of Okhotsk	
48°57′N 154°0′E	Russia	Sakhalin Oblast — islands of Ekarma and Shiashkotan, Kuril Islands
48°43′N 154°0′E	Pacific Ocean	Passing just east of the island of Minami-Tori-shima, Japan (at 24°17′N 153°59′E); Passing just east of Lukunor atoll, Federated States of Micronesia (at 5°30′N 153°49′E); Passing just west of Nissan Island, Papua New Guinea (at 4°32′S 154°14′E)
4°18′S 154°0′E	Solomon Sea	
11°21′S 154°0′E	Papua New Guinea	Rossel Island
11°24′S 154°0′E	Coral Sea	Passing through Australia's Coral Sea Islands Territory
29°59′S 154°0′E	Pacific Ocean	
60°0′S 154°0′E	Southern Ocean	
68°24′S 154°0′E	Antarctica	Australian Antarctic Territory, claimed by Australia

== See also ==
- 153rd meridian east
- 155th meridian east
