= 25th meridian west =

Line of longitude

25th meridian west

The meridian 25° west of Greenwich is a line of longitude that extends from the North Pole across the Arctic Ocean, Greenland, the Atlantic Ocean, Cape Verde Islands, the Southern Ocean, and Antarctica to the South Pole.

The 25th meridian west forms a great circle with the 155th meridian east.

In Antarctica, the meridian defines the eastern limit of Argentina's territorial claim and passes through the British claim - the two claims overlap.

== From Pole to Pole ==
Starting at the North Pole and heading south to the South Pole, the 25th meridian west passes through:

Co-ordinates	Country, territory or sea	Notes
90°0′N 25°0′W	Arctic Ocean	
83°9′N 25°0′W	Greenland	Peary Land peninsula
82°51′N 25°0′W	G.B. Schley Fjord	
82°30′N 25°0′W	Greenland	Peary Land peninsula
82°10′N 25°0′W	Independence Fjord	
82°0′N 25°0′W	Greenland	
81°43′N 25°0′W	Hagen Fjord	
81°35′N 25°0′W	Greenland	Mainland, Ymer Island, Ella Island and the mainland again (passing through the Stauning Alps at 72°0′N 25°0′W)
71°17′N 25°0′W	Scoresby Sound	
70°21′N 25°0′W	Greenland	
69°9′N 25°0′W	Atlantic Ocean	Passing just east of São Miguel Island, Azores, Portugal (at 37°51′N 25°8′W); Passing just west of the islet of Formigas, Azores, Portugal (at 36°16′N 24°47′W); Passing just east of Santa Maria Island, Azores, Portugal (at 36°56′N 25°1′W)
17°7′N 25°0′W	Cape Verde	Islands of Santo Antão and São Vicente
16°46′N 25°0′W	Atlantic Ocean	
60°0′S 25°0′W	Southern Ocean	
75°17′S 25°0′W	Antarctica	Defines the eastern limit of Argentine Antarctica, claimed by Argentina; Passes through British Antarctic Territory, claimed by United Kingdom

== See also ==
- 24th meridian west
- 26th meridian west
