= Nuakata Island =

Island in Papua New Guinea

Coordinates: 10°28′S 151°026′E

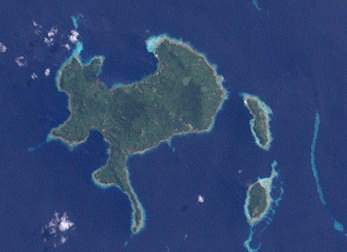
Nuakata Island Landsat Imagery

Nuakata Island is a small, mountainous island in the Goschen Strait south of Normanby Island and east of East Cape. It is part of Milne Bay Province in southeastern Papua New Guinea. Mount Tanorabwa is the highest point on the island at 1,072 feet (327 m).

== People ==
The island is inhabited by about 500 people. The people of the island speak a dialect of the 'Auhelawa language, also spoken on the south coast of Normanby Island. They live in traditional settlements and practicing subsistence horticulture and some harvesting of sea resources such as fish, beche-de-mer and trochus for cash. An international NGO, Conservation International, has selected the island for the future development of a community-based marine protected area.
