= 155th meridian east =

Line of longitude

155th meridian east

The meridian 155° east of Greenwich is a line of longitude that extends from the North Pole across the Arctic Ocean, Asia, the Pacific Ocean, Australasia, the Southern Ocean, and Antarctica to the South Pole.

The 155th meridian east forms a great circle with the 25th meridian west.

== From Pole to Pole ==
Starting at the North Pole and heading south to the South Pole, the 155th meridian east passes through:

Co-ordinates	Country, territory or sea	Notes
90°0′N 155°0′E	Arctic Ocean	
77°2′N 155°0′E	East Siberian Sea	
71°1′N 155°0′E	Russia	Sakha Republic; Magadan Oblast — from 66°7′N 155°0′E
60°22′N 155°0′E	Sea of Okhotsk	Shelikhov Gulf
59°26′N 155°0′E	Russia	Magadan Oblast
59°10′N 155°0′E	Sea of Okhotsk	
50°12′N 155°0′E	Russia	Sakhalin Oblast — Antsiferov Island, Kuril Islands
50°11′N 155°0′E	Pacific Ocean	Passing just east of the island of Onekotan, Sakhalin Oblast, Russia (at 49°37′N 154°54′E); Passing just west of the atoll of Oroluk, Federated States of Micronesia (at 7°33′N 154°54′E); Passing just east of the atoll of Nukuoro, Federated States of Micronesia (at 3°50′N 154°58′E); Passing just east of the atoll of Kapingamarangi, Federated States of Micronesia (at 1°4′N 154°49′E); Passing just east of the islands of Nuguria, Papua New Guinea (at 3°26′S 154°45′E)
5°32′S 155°0′E	Papua New Guinea	Bougainville Island
6°13′S 155°0′E	Solomon Sea	
11°45′S 155°0′E	Coral Sea	Passing through the Coral Sea Islands Territory, Australia
29°59′S 155°0′E	Pacific Ocean	
60°0′S 155°0′E	Southern Ocean	
68°46′S 155°0′E	Antarctica	Australian Antarctic Territory, claimed by Australia

== See also ==
- 154th meridian east
- 156th meridian east
