= Intelsat III F-5 =

Failed communications satellite

- Mission type: Communications
- Operator: Intelsat
- COSPAR ID: 1969-064A
- SATCAT no.: 04051
- Mission duration: 5 years planned Failed to orbit

Spacecraft properties
- Manufacturer: TRW
- Launch mass: 293 kilograms (646 lb)
- BOL mass: 151 kilograms (333 lb)
- Power: 183 W

Start of mission
- Launch date: July 26, 1969, 02:06 UTC
- Rocket: Delta M
- Launch site: Cape Canaveral LC-17A

End of mission
- Deactivated: October 14, 1988

Orbital parameters
- Reference system: Geocentric
- Regime: Low Earth
- Eccentricity: 0.07326
- Perigee altitude: 252 kilometers (157 mi)
- Apogee altitude: 1,301 kilometers (808 mi)
- Inclination: 30.3°
- Period: 115.3 minutes
- Epoch: July 26, 1969

Intelsat III F-5 was a communications satellite intended to be operated by Intelsat. Launched towards geostationary orbit in 1969 it failed to achieve orbit.

== Design ==
The fifth of eight Intelsat III satellites to be launched, Intelsat III F-5 was built by TRW. It was a 293-kilogram (646 lb) spacecraft equipped with two transponders to be powered by body-mounted solar cells generating 183 watts of power. It had a design life of five years and carried an SVM-2 apogee motor for propulsion.

== Launch ==
Intelsat III F-5 was launched by a Delta M rocket, flying from Launch Complex 17A at the Cape Canaveral Air Force Station. The launch took place on July 26, 1969, with the spacecraft bound for a geosynchronous transfer orbit.

Due to a failure in the third phase of the launch process, the satellite did not reach the desired orbit.

== See also ==
- 1969 in spaceflight
