= 154th meridian west =

Line of longitude

154th meridian west

The meridian 154° west of Greenwich is a line of longitude that extends from the North Pole across the Arctic Ocean, North America, the Pacific Ocean, the Southern Ocean, and Antarctica to the South Pole.

The 154th meridian west forms a great circle with the 26th meridian east.

== From Pole to Pole ==
Starting at the North Pole and heading south to the South Pole, the 154th meridian west passes through:

Co-ordinates	Country, territory or sea	Notes
90°0′N 154°0′W	Arctic Ocean	
71°45′N 154°0′W	Beaufort Sea	
70°50′N 154°0′W	United States	Alaska
59°21′N 154°0′W	Kamishak Bay	
59°4′N 154°0′W	United States	Alaska
58°29′N 154°0′W	Shelikof Strait	
57°39′N 154°0′W	United States	Alaska — Kodiak Island
56°44′N 154°0′W	Pacific Ocean	
56°33′N 154°0′W	United States	Alaska — Sitkinak Island
56°30′N 154°0′W	Pacific Ocean	Passing just west of Maupihaa atoll, French Polynesia (at 16°48′S 153°59′W)
60°0′S 154°0′W	Southern Ocean	
77°7′S 154°0′W	Antarctica	Ross Dependency, claimed by New Zealand

== See also ==
- 153rd meridian west
- 155th meridian west
