= 155th meridian west =

Line of longitude

155th meridian west

The meridian 155° west of Greenwich is a line of longitude that extends from the North Pole across the Arctic Ocean, North America, the Pacific Ocean, the Southern Ocean, and Antarctica to the South Pole.

The 155th meridian west forms a great circle with the 25th meridian east.

== From Pole to Pole ==
Starting at the North Pole and heading south to the South Pole, the 155th meridian west passes through:

Co-ordinates	Country, territory or sea	Notes
90°0′N 155°0′W	Arctic Ocean	
71°36′N 155°0′W	Beaufort Sea	
71°8′N 155°0′W	United States	Alaska
58°1′N 155°0′W	Pacific Ocean	Passing just west of Kodiak Island, Alaska, United States (at 57°20′N 154°47′W); Passing just west of Tugidak Island, Alaska, United States (at 56°25′N 154°48′W)
19°44′N 155°0′W	United States	Hawaii — Hawaii island
19°20′N 155°0′W	Pacific Ocean	Passing just west of Malden Island, Kiribati (at 4°0′S 154°58′W)
60°0′S 155°0′W	Southern Ocean	
77°12′S 155°0′W	Antarctica	Ross Dependency, claimed by New Zealand

== See also ==
- 154th meridian west
- 156th meridian west
