= 153rd meridian west =

Line of longitude

153rd meridian west

The meridian 153° west of Greenwich is a line of longitude that extends from the North Pole across the Arctic Ocean, North America, the Pacific Ocean, the Southern Ocean, and Antarctica to the South Pole.

The 153rd meridian west forms a great circle with the 27th meridian east.

== From Pole to Pole ==
Starting at the North Pole and heading south to the South Pole, the 153rd meridian west passes through:

Co-ordinates	Country, territory or sea	Notes
90°0′N 153°0′W	Arctic Ocean	
71°54′N 153°0′W	Beaufort Sea	
70°54′N 153°0′W	United States	Alaska
59°48′N 153°0′W	Cook Inlet	
58°45′N 153°0′W	Shelikof Strait	Passing just east of Cape Douglas, Alaska, United States (at 58°51′N 143°14′W)
58°18′N 153°0′W	United States	Alaska — Afognak Island, Raspberry Island, Kodiak Island and Sitkalidak Island
57°7′N 153°0′W	Pacific Ocean	Passing just west of Rimatara island, French Polynesia (at 22°38′S 152°52′W)
60°0′S 153°0′W	Southern Ocean	
77°15′S 153°0′W	Antarctica	Ross Dependency, claimed by New Zealand

== See also ==
- 152nd meridian west
- 154th meridian west
