= 26th meridian east =

Line of longitude

26th meridian east (interactive map)

The meridian 26° east of Greenwich is a line of longitude that extends from the North Pole across the Arctic Ocean, Europe, Africa, the Indian Ocean, the Southern Ocean, and Antarctica to the South Pole.

The 26th meridian east forms a great circle with the 154th meridian west.

== From Pole to Pole ==
Starting at the North Pole and heading south to the South Pole, the 26th meridian east passes through:

Co-ordinates	Country, territory or sea	Notes
90°0′N 26°0′E	Arctic Ocean	
80°10′N 26°0′E	Norway	Island of Nordaustlandet, Svalbard
79°40′N 26°0′E	Barents Sea	
71°8′N 26°0′E	Norway	Island of Magerøya
70°58′N 26°0′E	Porsangerfjorden	
70°39′N 26°0′E	Norway	
69°43′N 26°0′E	Finland	
60°16′N 26°0′E	Baltic Sea	Gulf of Finland
59°37′N 26°0′E	Estonia	
57°52′N 26°0′E	Latvia	
55°58′N 26°0′E	Lithuania	
54°57′N 26°0′E	Belarus	
51°56′N 26°0′E	Ukraine	Rivne Oblast — passing just east of Varash; Volyn Oblast — for about 9 km Rivne Oblast — for about 6 km Volyn Oblast — for about 13 km Rivne Oblast — passing just west of Rivne; Ternopil Oblast — passing just west of Borshchiv; Chernivtsi Oblast — passing through Chernivtsi
47°58′N 26°0′E	Romania	Passing just west of Bucharest
43°53′N 26°0′E	Bulgaria	Passing just east of Ruse
41°20′N 26°0′E	Greece	
40°49′N 26°0′E	Mediterranean Sea	Aegean Sea
40°9′N 26°0′E	Turkey	Island of Imbros
40°8′N 26°0′E	Mediterranean Sea	Aegean Sea
39°51′N 26°0′E	Turkey	Island of Bozcaada
39°49′N 26°0′E	Mediterranean Sea	Aegean Sea
39°17′N 26°0′E	Greece	Island of Lesbos
39°7′N 26°0′E	Mediterranean Sea	Aegean Sea
38°36′N 26°0′E	Greece	Island of Chios
38°10′N 26°0′E	Mediterranean Sea	Aegean Sea
37°34′N 26°0′E	Greece	Island of Icaria
37°31′N 26°0′E	Mediterranean Sea	Aegean Sea
36°56′N 26°0′E	Greece	Island of Amorgos
36°53′N 26°0′E	Mediterranean Sea	Aegean Sea
35°12′N 26°0′E	Greece	Island of Crete
35°1′N 26°0′E	Mediterranean Sea	
31°36′N 26°0′E	Egypt	
22°0′N 26°0′E	Sudan	
10°9′N 26°0′E	South Sudan	
7°0′N 26°0′E	Central African Republic	
5°14′N 26°0′E	Democratic Republic of the Congo	
11°56′S 26°0′E	Zambia	
17°59′S 26°0′E	Zimbabwe	
19°9′S 26°0′E	Botswana	Passing just east of Gaborone
24°43′S 26°0′E	South Africa	North West; Free State; Eastern Cape
33°43′S 26°0′E	Indian Ocean	
60°0′S 26°0′E	Southern Ocean	
70°9′S 26°0′E	Antarctica	Queen Maud Land, claimed by Norway

== See also ==
- 25th meridian east
- 27th meridian east
