= Hellas Sat =

Coordinates: 0°0′N 39°00′E

- Formerly: Hellas Sat Consortium Ltd.
- Type: Limited
- Industry: Communications satellite
- Founded: 2001
- Headquarters: Athens, Greece, Nicosia, Cyprus
- Areas served: Greece and Cyprus
- Owner: Arabsat
- Website: www.hellas-sat.net

Hellas Sat Consortium Ltd (Hellas Sat) is the owner and a wholesaler of capacity and services of the Greek/Cypriot Hellas Sat 2 satellite, an Astrium Eurostar E2000+, which was launched successfully on 13 May 2003 to the 39th eastern meridian orbital position in the geostationary satellite orbit. On 29 June 2017 the Hellas Sat 3 was launched successfully to replace Hellas Sat 2.

Hellas Sat has developed a network of strategically located telecommunication partners with Digital Video Broadcasting platforms, carrying over 100 television channels, and Internet protocol-based services through its two fixed beams over Europe, and two steerable beams over the Middle East and South Africa. It offers high-power, direct-to-home transmissions as well as occasional video feeds and Internet access services.

== Satellite ==
Hellas Sat 2 is an ASTRIUM Eurostar 2000+ platform spacecraft at orbital position 39° east. It was launched on 13 May 2003, and has an expected lifetime of 15 years. It has 30+8 (redundant) Ku band 36 MHz transponders

== Launch Consultants ==
RPC Telecom acted as the International Telecommunication Union filing and frequency coordination consultant, while Petrosat WLL was the launch consultant.

== Television and radio services ==
One of Hellas Sat's strategic partners is Satellite Telecommunications Network (STN), which offers comprehensive television and/or radio channel distribution services. STN offers standard-definition television (STDV) and/or high-definition television (HDTV) play-out services, SDTV and/or HDTV turnaround services as well as encryption, subtitling, and other services. STN was also behind the transmission of Euro1080-HD1 on Hellas-Sat-2, Europe's first HDTV channel.
