= 30th meridian west =

Line of longitude

30th meridian west

The meridian 30° west of Greenwich is a line of longitude that extends from the North Pole across the Arctic Ocean, Greenland, the Atlantic Ocean, the Southern Ocean, and Antarctica to the South Pole.

The 30th meridian west forms a great circle with the 150th meridian east, and it is the reference meridian for the time zone UTC-2.

Between the 45th and 61st parallels north, the meridian forms the boundary between the Gander and Shanwick Oceanic air traffic control areas, and for this reason is also known as the "Molson-Guinness Line".

== From Pole to Pole ==
Starting at the North Pole and heading south to the South Pole, the 30th meridian west passes through:

Co-ordinates	Country, territory or sea	Notes
90°0′N 30°0′W	Arctic Ocean	
83°35′N 30°0′W	Greenland	H.H. Benedict Range (Northern Peary Land)
83°10′N 30°0′W	Frederick E. Hyde Fjord	
83°8′N 30°0′W	Greenland	Bronlund Fjord (Southern Peary Land)
82°10′N 30°0′W	Independence Fjord	
81°55′N 30°0′W	Greenland	Mainland and Sokongen Island
68°10′N 30°0′W	Atlantic Ocean	
60°0′S 30°0′W	Southern Ocean	
76°35′S 30°0′W	Antarctica	Claimed by both Argentina (Argentine Antarctica) and United Kingdom (British Antarctic Territory)

== See also ==
- 29th meridian west
- 31st meridian west
- Beyond Thirty
