= 27th meridian west =

Line of longitude

27th meridian west

The meridian 27° west of Greenwich is a line of longitude that extends from the North Pole across the Arctic Ocean, Greenland, the Atlantic Ocean, the Southern Ocean, and Antarctica to the South Pole.

The 27th meridian west forms a great circle with the 153rd meridian east.

== From Pole to Pole ==
Starting at the North Pole and heading south to the South Pole, the 27th meridian west passes through:

Co-ordinates	Country, territory or sea	Notes
90°0′N 27°0′W	Arctic Ocean	
83°27′N 27°0′W	Greenland	Daly Range (Northern Peary Land)
83°9′N 27°0′W	Frederick E. Hyde Fjord	
83°3′N 27°0′W	Greenland	Melville Land (Southern Peary Land)
82°11′N 27°0′W	Independence Fjord	
82°2′N 27°0′W	Greenland	Mainland, the island of Milne Land and the mainland again
68°38′N 27°0′W	Atlantic Ocean	Passing just east of Terceira Island, Azores, Portugal (at 38°42′N 27°2′W); Passing just east of Visokoi Island, South Georgia and the South Sandwich Islands (at 56°43′S 27°4′W); Passing just west of Vindication Island, South Georgia and the South Sandwich Islands (at 57°6′S 26°48′W); Passing just west of Bristol Island, South Georgia and the South Sandwich Islands (at 59°2′S 26°40′W); Passing just east of Bellingshausen Island, South Georgia and the South Sandwich Islands (at 59°26′S 27°4′W)
60°0′S 27°0′W	Southern Ocean	
76°0′S 27°0′W	Antarctica	Claimed by both Argentina (Argentine Antarctica) and United Kingdom (British Antarctic Territory)

== See also ==
- 26th meridian west
- 28th meridian west
