= 29th meridian west =

Line of longitude

29th meridian west

The meridian 29° west of Greenwich is a line of longitude that extends from the North Pole across the Arctic Ocean, Greenland, the Atlantic Ocean, the Southern Ocean, and Antarctica to the South Pole.

The 29th meridian west forms a great circle with the 151st meridian east.

== From Pole to Pole ==
Starting at the North Pole and heading south to the South Pole, the 29th meridian west passes through:

Co-ordinates	Country, territory or sea	Notes
90°0′N 29°0′W	Arctic Ocean	
83°33′N 29°0′W	Bliss Bay	
83°30′N 29°0′W	Greenland	Johannes V. Jensen Land (Northern Peary Land)
83°10′N 29°0′W	Frederick E. Hyde Fjord	
83°7′N 29°0′W	Greenland	Melville Land (Southern Peary Land)
82°9′N 29°0′W	Independence Fjord	
81°59′N 29°0′W	Greenland	
68°21′N 29°0′W	Atlantic Ocean	Passing just west of Faial Island, Azores, Portugal (at 38°35′N 28°50′W); Passing just east of the Saint Peter and Saint Paul Archipelago in the Intertropical Convergence Zone, Brazil (at 00°55′N 29°20′W); Passing just west of the island of Martim Vaz, Brazil (at 20°28′S 28°51′W); Passing just east of the island of Trindade, Brazil (at 20°31′S 29°18′W)
60°0′S 29°0′W	Southern Ocean	
76°21′S 29°0′W	Antarctica	Claimed by both Argentina (Argentine Antarctica) and United Kingdom (British Antarctic Territory)

== See also ==
- 28th meridian west
- 30th meridian west
