= Delta M =

American expendable launch system

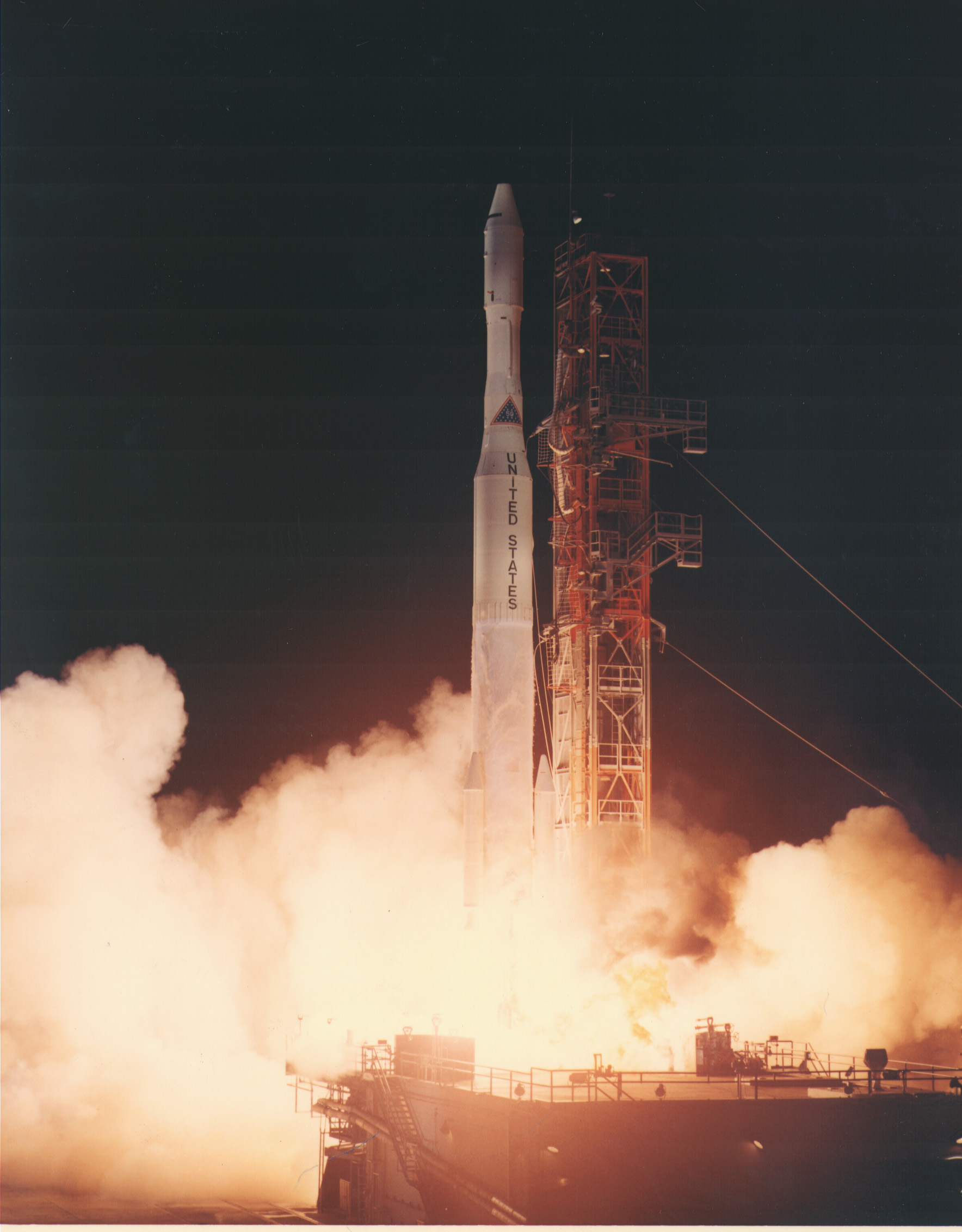
- Launch of first Delta M, with Intelsat III F-1
- Function: Expendable launch system
- Country of origin: United States

Launch history
- Status: Retired
- Launch sites: Cape Canaveral, LC-17A
- Total launches: 13
- Success(es): 11
- Failure: 2
- First flight: 18 September 1968
- Last flight: 17 March 1971

The Delta M or Thor-Delta M was an American expendable launch system used for thirteen orbital launches between 1968 and 1971. It was a member of the Delta family of rockets.

The Delta M had a three-stage configuration. The first stage was the Long Tank Thor, a stretched version of the Thor missile, previously flown on the Delta L. Three Castor-2 solid rocket boosters were attached to the first stage to increase thrust at lift-off. A Delta E was used as the second stage, and the third stage was a Star-37D solid rocket motor. On the final flight, six boosters were flown instead of three, in a configuration known as the Delta M6, or "Super Six."

All thirteen launches were made from Launch Complex 17A at the Cape Canaveral Air Force Station (CCAFS). The first launch carrying Intelsat III F-1 on 18 September 1968, was a complete failure when the first stage began suffering abnormal pitch gyrations starting at T+20 seconds. The booster maintained a stable attitude until around T+100 seconds when it pitched over and began to break up from structural loads. As the Delta was also headed back towards land, Range Safety Officer sent the destruct signal at T+108 seconds. It was bound for a Geostationary transfer orbit above the Atlantic Ocean and be in operation in time to relay broadcasts of the next month's 1968 Summer Olympics in Mexico City.

The fifth launch on 25 July 1969, Intelsat III F-5 suffered a rupture of either the third stage casing or nozzle and ended up in an unusable orbit. Of the thirteen launches, twelve carried geosynchronous communications satellites. The thirteenth, which was the final flight and the only one in the Delta-M6 configuration, placed Explorer 43 into a highly elliptical orbit.
