= List of Atlas LV3C launches =

Atlas-Centaur
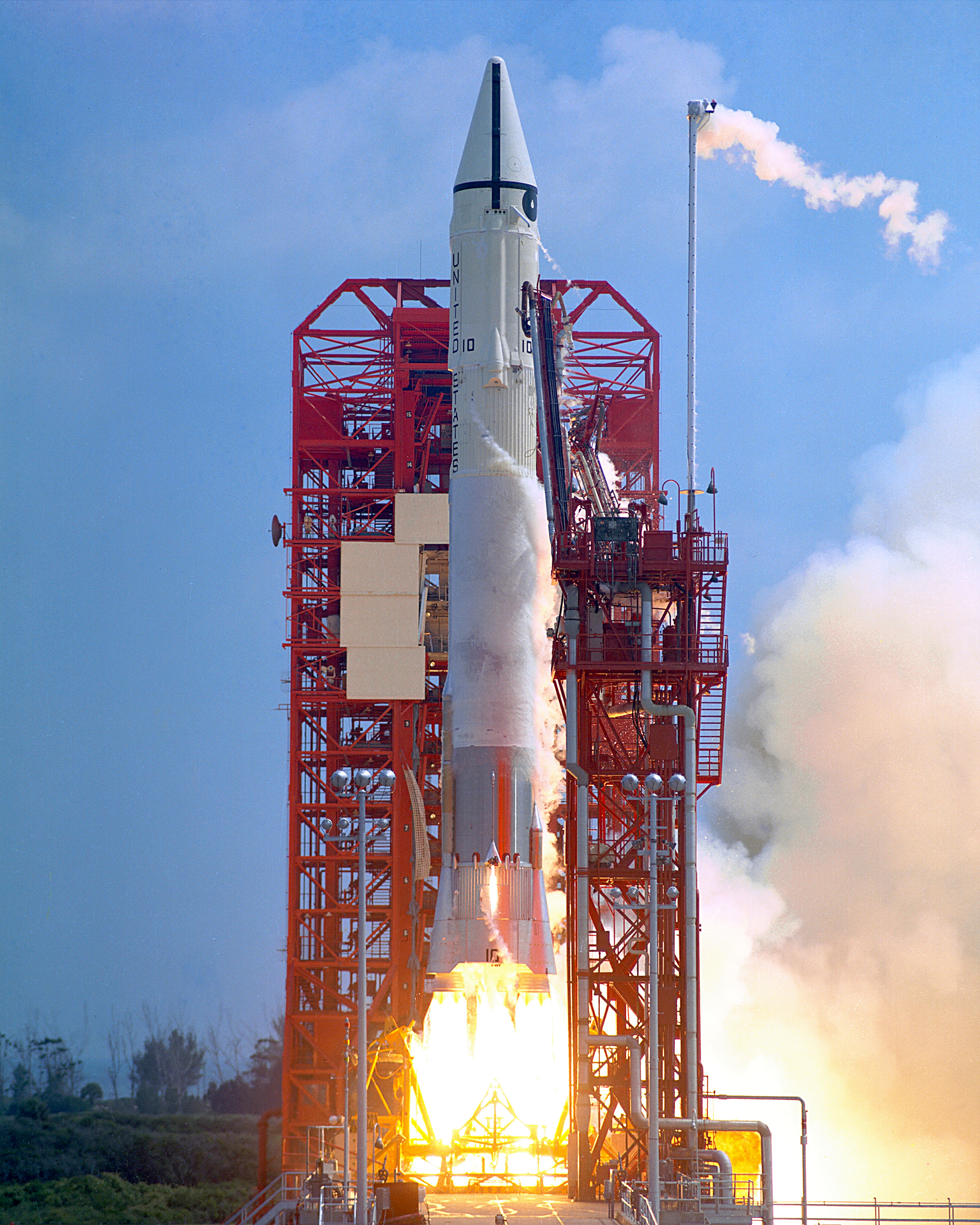
- An Atlas-Centaur launching Surveyor 1 (1966)
- Function: Expendable launch system
- Manufacturer: Convair Division of General Dynamics
- Country of origin: United States

Launch history
- Status: Retired
- Launch sites: Cape Canaveral, LC-36
- Total launches: 60
- Success(es): 48
- Failure: 8
- Partial failure: 4
- First flight: 8 May 1962
- Last flight: 19 May 1983

== About the Atlas LV3C ==
The Atlas-Centaur was a United States expendable launch vehicle derived from the SM-65 Atlas D missile. Launches were conducted from Launch Complex 36 at the Cape Canaveral Air Force Station (CCAFS) in Florida.

== Launch statistics ==
=== Launch Outcomes ===
- Success
- Failure
- Partial failure

=== Launch Pads ===
- CCAFS LC-36A
- CCAFS LC-36B

=== Target orbit ===
- Suborbital
- LEO
- MEO
- HEO
- GEO
- IPT
- GTO
- Heliocentric

== Launches ==
The data in this table comes from, and
Number	Date/Time (UTC)	Rocket	S/N	Launch site	Payload	Function	Orbit	Outcome	Remarks
1	1962-05-08; 19:49	Atlas-Centaur-A LV-3C	AC-1	CCAFS LC-36A		Test flight vehicle	Suborbital	Failure	First launch of the Atlas-Centaur vehicle. Centaur insulation panel separated prematurely, resulting in LH2 tank rupture at T+54 seconds and subsequent complete launch vehicle destruction.
2	1963-11-27; 19:03	Atlas-Centaur-B LV-3C	AC-2	CCAFS LC-36A		Test flight vehicle	LEO	Success	Performed first liquid hydrogen rocket engine firing in space.
3	1964-06-30; 14:04	Atlas-Centaur-C LV-3C	AC-3	CCAFS LC-36A		Test flight vehicle	LEO (target)	Failure	Centaur hydraulics pump failed, causing engine shutdown 253 seconds after Centaur ignition.
4	1964-12-11; 14:25	Atlas-Centaur-C LV-3C	AC-4	CCAFS LC-36A	Surveyor mass model	Test flight vehicle	MEO (target); LEO (actual)	Partial failure	Centaur ullage rocket design flaw prevented it from restarting.
5	1965-03-02; 13:25	Atlas-Centaur-C LV-3C	AC-5	CCAFS LC-36A	Surveyor SD-1	Test flight vehicle	MEO (target)	Failure	Booster fuel prevalves accidentally closed at T+2 seconds, causing loss of booster engine thrust. Vehicle fell back onto the pad and exploded.
6	1965-08-11; 14:31	Atlas-Centaur-D LV-3C	AC-6	CCAFS LC-36B	Surveyor SD-2	Test flight vehicle	HEO	Success	
7	1966-04-08; 01:00	Atlas-Centaur-D LV-3C	AC-8	CCAFS LC-36B	Surveyor SD-3	Test flight vehicle	HEO (target) / LEO (actual)	Partial failure	Centaur stage ran out of ullage propellant before restarting.
8	1966-05-30; 14:41	Atlas-Centaur-D LV-3C	AC-10	CCAFS LC-36A	Surveyor 1	Lunar lander	HEO	Success	First American lander to soft-land on the Moon.
9	1966-09-20; 12:32	Atlas-Centaur-D LV-3C	AC-7	CCAFS LC-36A	Surveyor 2	Lunar lander	HEO	Success	Spacecraft failed en route to the Moon.
10	1966-10-26; 11:12	Atlas-Centaur-D LV-3C	AC-9	CCAFS LC-36B	Surveyor SD-4	Test flight vehicle	HEO	Success	Performed first ever liquid hydrogen rocket engine restart in space.
11	1967-04-07; 07:05	Atlas-Centaur-D LV-3C	AC-12	CCAFS LC-36B	Surveyor 3	Lunar lander	HEO	Success	
12	1967-07-14; 11:53	Atlas-Centaur-D LV-3C	AC-11	CCAFS LC-36A	Surveyor 4	Lunar lander	HEO	Success	Spacecraft crash landed on the Moon.
13	1967-09-08; 07:57	Atlas-Centaur-D SLV-3C	AC-13	CCAFS LC-36B	Surveyor 5	Lunar lander	HEO	Success	
14	1967-11-07; 07:39	Atlas-Centaur-D SLV-3C	AC-14	CCAFS LC-36B	Surveyor 6	Lunar lander	HEO	Success	
15	1968-01-07; 06:30	Atlas-Centaur-D SLV-3C	AC-15	CCAFS LC-36A	Surveyor 7	Lunar lander	HEO	Success	
16	1968-08-10; 22:33	Atlas-Centaur-D SLV-3C	AC-17	CCAFS LC-36A	ATS-4	Communication/Meteorology	GEO (target)	Partial failure	Centaur stage failed to restart due to oxidizer leak.
17	1968-12-07; 08:40	Atlas-Centaur-D SLV-3C	AC-16	CCAFS LC-36B	OAO-2	High energy astronomy research	LEO	Success	
18	1969-02-25; 01:29	Atlas-Centaur-D SLV-3C	AC-20	CCAFS LC-36B	Mariner 6	Mars flyby probe	IPT	Success	
19	1969-03-27; 22:22	Atlas-Centaur-D SLV-3C	AC-19	CCAFS LC-36A	Mariner 7	Mars flyby probe	IPT	Success	
20	1969-08-12; 11:01	Atlas-Centaur-D SLV-3C	AC-18	CCAFS LC-36A	ATS-5	Communication/Meteorology	GEO	Success	
21	1970-11-30; 22:40:05	Atlas-Centaur SLV-3C	AC-21	CCAFS LC-36B	OAO-B	Astronomy	LEO (target)	Failure	Payload fairing failed to separate
22	1971-01-26; 00:36:03	Atlas-Centaur SLV-3C	AC-25	CCAFS LC-36A	Intelsat 4 F2	Comsat	GTO	Success	
23	1971-05-09; 01:11:02	Atlas-Centaur SLV-3C	AC-24	CCAFS LC-36A	Mariner 8	Mars probe	Heliocentric (target)	Failure	Damaged circuit board in Centaur resulted in control failure and engine shutdown at T+365 seconds.
24	1971-12-20; 01:10:04	Atlas-Centaur SLV-3C	AC-26	CCAFS LC-36A	Intelsat 4 F3	Comsat	GTO	Success	
25	1972-01-23; 00:12:04	Atlas-Centaur SLV-3C	AC-28	CCAFS LC-36B	Intelsat 4 F4	Comsat	GTO	Success	
26	1972-03-03; 01:49:04	Atlas-Centaur SLV-3C	AC-27	CCAFS LC-36A	Pioneer 10	Jupiter probe	Heliocentric	Success	First probe to visit Jupiter; Solar System escape velocity achieved on Jupiter fly-by
27	1972-06-13; 21:53:04	Atlas-Centaur SLV-3C	AC-29	CCAFS LC-36B	Intelsat 4 F5	Comsat	GTO	Success	
28	1972-08-21; 10:28:02	Atlas-Centaur SLV-3C	AC-22	CCAFS LC-36B	OAO-3	Astronomy	LEO	Success	Final flight of Atlas-Centaur SLV-3C
29	1973-04-06; 02:11:00	Atlas-Centaur SLV-3D	AC-30	CCAFS LC-36B	Pioneer 11	Planetary probe	Heliocentric	Success	Maiden flight of Atlas-Centaur SLV-3D; First probe to visit Saturn; Solar System escape velocity achieved on Jupiter fly-by
30	1973-08-23; 22:57:02	Atlas-Centaur SLV-3D	AC-31	CCAFS LC-36A	Intelsat 4 F7	Comsat	GTO	Success	
31	1973-11-03; 05:45:00	Atlas-Centaur SLV-3D	AC-34	CCAFS LC-36B	Mariner 10	Planetary probe	Heliocentric	Success	
32	1974-11-21; 23:43:59	Atlas-Centaur SLV-3D	AC-32	CCAFS LC-36B	Intelsat 4 F8	Comsat	GTO	Success	
33	1975-02-20; 23:35:00	Atlas-Centaur SLV-3D	AC-33	CCAFS LC-36A	Intelsat 4 F6	Comsat	GTO (target)	Failure	Improper separation of a lanyard during booster jettison reset the Atlas programmer and caused erroneous flight path. RSO T+413 seconds.
34	1975-05-22; 22:04:00	Atlas-Centaur SLV-3D	AC-35	CCAFS LC-36A	Intelsat 4 F1	Comsat	GTO	Success	
35	1975-09-26; 00:17:00	Atlas-Centaur SLV-3D	AC-36	CCAFS LC-36B	Intelsat 4A F1	Comsat	GTO	Success	
36	1976-01-29; 23:56	Atlas-Centaur SLV-3D	AC-37	CCAFS LC-36B	Intelsat 4A F2	Comsat	GTO	Success	
37	1976-05-13; 22:28	Atlas-Centaur SLV-3D	AC-38	CCAFS LC-36A	Comstar D1	Comsat	GTO	Success	
38	1976-07-22; 22:04:00	Atlas-Centaur SLV-3D	AC-40	CCAFS LC-36B	Comstar D2	Comsat	GTO	Success	
39	1977-05-26; 21:47:01	Atlas-Centaur SLV-3D	AC-39	CCAFS LC-36A	Intelsat 4A F4	Comsat	GTO	Success	
40	1977-08-12; 06:29:31	Atlas-Centaur SLV-3D	AC-45	CCAFS LC-36B	HEAO-1	Astronomy	LEO	Success	
41	1977-09-30; 01:02:59	Atlas-Centaur SLV-3D	AC-43	CCAFS LC-36A	Intelsat 4A F5	Comsat	GTO	Failure	Corroded plumbing resulted in a gas generator leak and thrust section fire during ascent. Vehicle self-destructed T+55 seconds.
42	1978-01-07; 00:15:00	Atlas-Centaur SLV-3D	AC-46	CCAFS LC-36B	Intelsat 4A F3	Comsat	GTO	Success	
43	1978-02-09; 21:17:01	Atlas-Centaur SLV-3D	AC-44	CCAFS LC-36A	FLTSATCOM-1	Comsat	GTO	Success	
44	1978-03-31; 23:36:01	Atlas-Centaur SLV-3D	AC-48	CCAFS LC-36B	Intelsat 4A F6	Comsat	GTO	Success	
45	1978-05-20; 13:13:00	Atlas-Centaur SLV-3D	AC-50	CCAFS LC-36A	Pioneer Venus Orbiter	Venus probe	Heliocentric	Success	
46	1978-06-29; 22:24:59	Atlas-Centaur SLV-3D	AC-41	CCAFS LC-36B	Comstar D3	Comsat	GTO	Success	
47	1978-08-08; 07:33	Atlas-Centaur SLV-3D	AC-51	CCAFS LC-36A	Pioneer Venus Multiprobe	Venus probe	Heliocentric	Success	
48	1978-11-13; 05:24	Atlas-Centaur SLV-3D	AC-52	CCAFS LC-36B	HEAO-2	Astronomy	LEO	Success	
49	4 May 1979; 18:57:00	Atlas-Centaur SLV-3D	AC-47	CCAFS, LC-36A	FLTSATCOM-2	Comsat	GTO	Success	
50	20 September 1979; 05:28	Atlas-Centaur SLV-3D	AC-53	CCAFS, LC-36B	HEAO-3	Astronomy	LEO	Success	
51	1980-01-18; 01:26:00	Atlas-Centaur SLV-3D	AC-49	CCAFS, LC-36A	FLTSATCOM-3	Communications satellite	GTO	Success	
52	1980-10-31; 03:54:00	Atlas-Centaur SLV-3D	AC-57	CCAFS, LC-36A	FLTSATCOM-4	Communications satellite	GTO	Success	
53	1980-12-06; 23:31:00	Atlas-Centaur SLV-3D	AC-54	CCAFS, LC-36B	Intelsat V F-2	COMSAT	GTO	Success	
54	1981-02-21; 23:23:00	Atlas-Centaur SLV-3D	AC-42	CCAFS LC-36A	Comstar D4	Communications satellite	GTO	Success	
55	23 May 1981; 22:42:00	Atlas-Centaur SLV-3D	AC-56	CCAFS, LC-36B	Intelsat V F-1	COMSAT	GTO	Success	
56	1981-08-06; 08:16:00	Atlas-Centaur SLV-3D	AC-59	CCAFS, LC-36A	FLTSATCOM-5	Communications satellite	GTO	Partial failure	Fairing collapsed during ascent, damaging spacecraft
57	1981-12-15; 23:35	Atlas-Centaur SLV-3D	AC-55	CCAFS, LC-36B	Intelsat V F-3	COMSAT	GTO	Success	
58	1982-03-05; 00:23	Atlas-Centaur SLV-3D	AC-58	CCAFS LC-36A	Intelsat V -504	Comsat	GTO	Success	
59	1982-09-28; 23:17	Atlas-Centaur SLV-3D	AC-60	CCAFS LC-36B	Intelsat V -505	Comsat	GTO	Success	
60	1983-05-19; 22:26	Atlas-Centaur SLV-3D	AC-61	CCAFS LC-36A	Intelsat V -506	Comsat	GTO	Success	Final flight of the Atlas-Centaur rocket.
