= Cape Canaveral Launch Complex 36 =

Launch complex at Cape Canaveral Space Force Station in Brevard County, Florida 36

Launch Complex 36
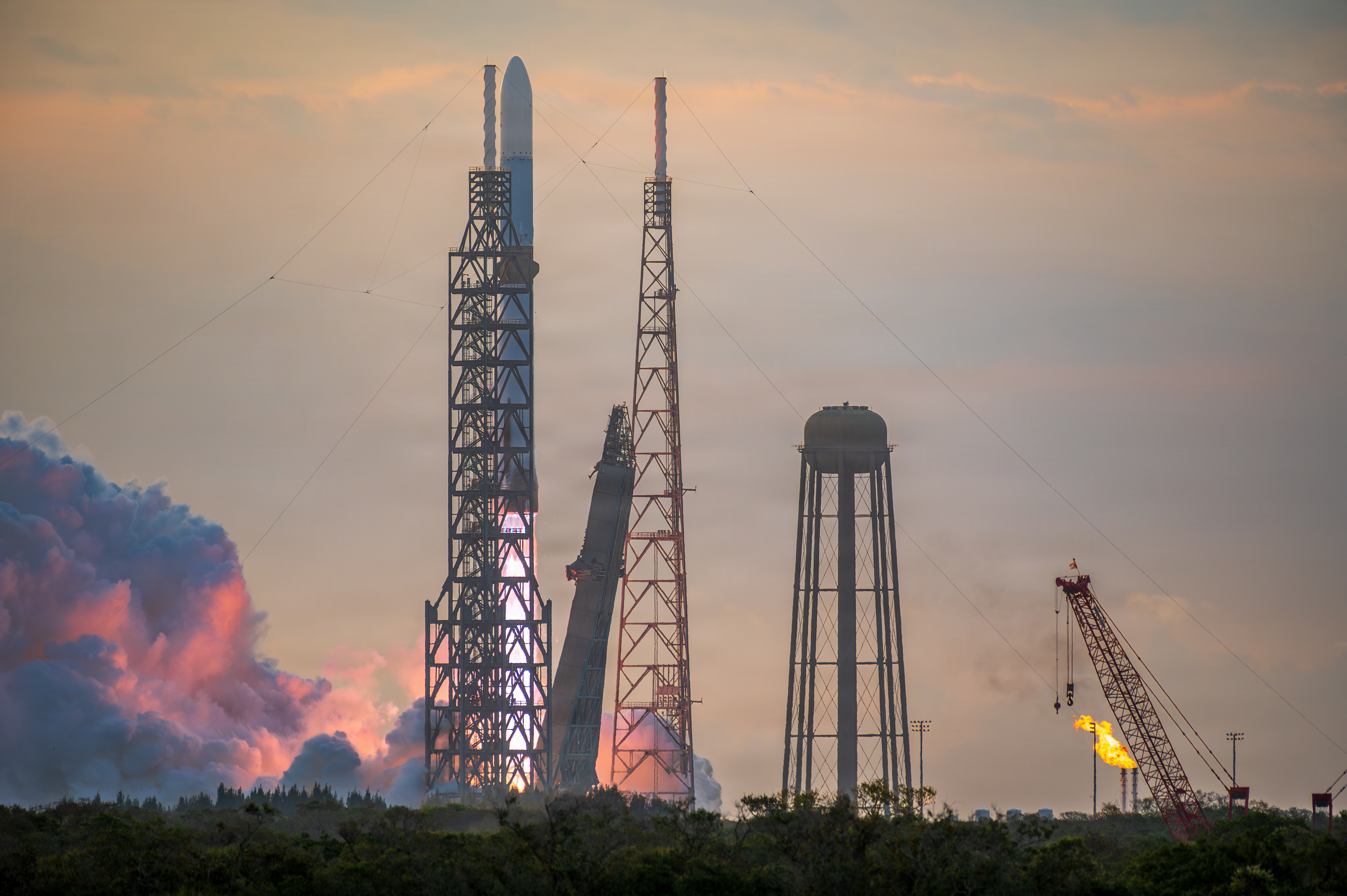
- LC-36A in April 2026, during the launch of a New Glenn rocket
- Interactive map of Launch Complex 36
- Launch site: Cape Canaveral Space Force Station
- Coordinates: 28°28′14″N 80°32′24″W
- Time zone: UTC−05:00 (EST)
  - Summer (DST): UTC−04:00 (EDT)
- Short name: LC-36
- Operator: United States Space Force (owner); Space Florida (tenant); Blue Origin (subtenant)
- Total launches: 148
- Launch pad: 2
- Orbital inclination range: 28° - 57°
LC-36A launch history
- Status: Undergoing reconstruction
- Launches: 72
- First launch: May 18, 1962; Atlas-Centaur (AC-1)
- Last launch: April 19, 2026; New Glenn 7×2 (Bluebird 7)
- Associated rockets: Suspended: New Glenn 7×2; Retired: Atlas-Centaur, Atlas II; Plans cancelled: Athena III
LC-36B launch history
- Status: Under construction
- Launches: 76
- First launch: August 11, 1965; Atlas-Centaur (Surveyor SD-2)
- Last launch: February 3, 2005; Atlas III (NROL-23)
- Associated rockets: Future: New Glenn 9×4; Retired: Atlas-Centaur, Atlas G, Atlas I, Atlas II, Atlas III; Plans cancelled: Athena III

Launch Complex 36 (LC-36) is a launch complex located at the Cape Canaveral Space Force Station in Florida. Located south of the Missile Row launch range, the complex originally consisted of two pads—designated LC-36A and LC-36B—to support the flights of Atlas launch vehicles equipped with a Centaur upper stage. From the 1960s to the 1980s, LC-36 was used by NASA and the United States Air Force to launch many payloads from the Atlas-Centaur and its derivatives, including the Pioneer, Surveyor, and Mariner probes. During the late 1980s, LC-36B was also used to launch the Atlas G, and General Dynamics (and later Lockheed Martin) modified the two pads to support the larger Atlas I, Atlas II, and Atlas III throughout the 1990s and early 2000s.

Following the Atlas program's relocation to Space Launch Complex 41 (SLC-41) in 2005, LC-36 stood vacant until Blue Origin acquired the lease in 2015 for use by their heavy-lift New Glenn rocket. The company made extensive modifications to the complex during this time, including demolishing 36A and 36B, rebuilding one large 36A in their place, as well as integrating the neighboring Launch Complex 11 (LC-11) into the facility. Following this large-scale renovation, the new era of LC-36 commenced with the maiden flight of New Glenn in January 2025. On May 28, 2026, a catastrophic failure during a static fire attempt of New Glenn resulted in significant damage to the pad.

Blue Origin plans to build a new LC-36B, even larger than the rebuilt LC-36A, capable of supporting the larger 9×4 variant of New Glenn.

== History ==
LC-36 was originally constructed by the US government in the early 1960s in order to launch the Atlas-Centaur rocket, with first launch in May 1962.

LC-36A was previously the scene of the biggest on-pad explosion in Cape history when Atlas-Centaur AC-5 fell back onto the pad on March 2, 1965. The accident spurred NASA to complete work on LC-36B which had been abandoned when it was 90% finished.

LC-36B was built near LC-36A "due to the Atlas-Centaur’s increasing flight rate – and low reliability early on."

The pad was modified by the operator of Atlas during the late 1980s to be able to launch the Atlas I, with first launch occurring in July 1990, and was subsequently modified two additional times during the 1990s to launch the Atlas II and Atlas III launch vehicles. Atlas III made its sixth and final launch from LC-36 in 2005.

There was a total of 68 and 77 launches from pads 36A and 36B, respectively, while the US government operated the launch complex in the first five decades of spaceflight.

=== Interregnum ===
The pad was unused from mid-2005 through 2015.

The legacy Atlas-Centaur umbilical towers of both pads were demolished in 2006. The mobile service towers were both demolished in controlled explosions on June 16, 2007. Tower B was demolished at 13:59 GMT (09:59 EDT) and tower A followed twelve minutes later at 14:11 (10:11 EDT).

In 2008, Aviation Week magazine reported that the U.S. Air Force committed to lease Launch Complex 36 to Space Florida for future use by the Athena III launch system, but that program never moved forward.

In March 2010, the USAF 45th Space Wing issued real property licenses to Space Florida for Space Launch Complexes 36 and 46 at Cape Canaveral Space Force Station.

Moon Express leased the pad in February 2015 from Space Florida as a development and test site for its commercial lunar operations and its lunar lander flight test vehicles.

In 2015, Blue Origin signed a long-term lease of launch site from Space Florida for launching Blue's orbital rockets, after Space Florida had previously leased the facility from the USAF in 2010 in order to facilitate commercial use of the land and facilities since the Air Force no longer required use of the launch complex. Moon Express and Blue Origin shared LC-36, delineated into LC-36A and LC-36B respectively, until Moon Express announced its relocation to Launch Complexes 17 and 18 in 2016, allowing Blue Origin full use of the LC-36 facility. In early 2016, Blue intended to begin orbital launches by 2020, as of 2019 they are expected to begin from LC-36 no earlier than 2024, although the launch finally occurred on 16 January 2025.

=== Blue Origin ===
On September 15, 2015, Blue Origin announced it would use Launch Complex 36 for launches of its orbital launch vehicle later in the decade. Blue had the lease in place for Launch Complex 36 by late 2015 from the Florida state space agency, Space Florida, and will manufacture their new BE-4-powered orbital launch vehicle at the nearby Exploration Park, also a part of the Space Florida land complex.

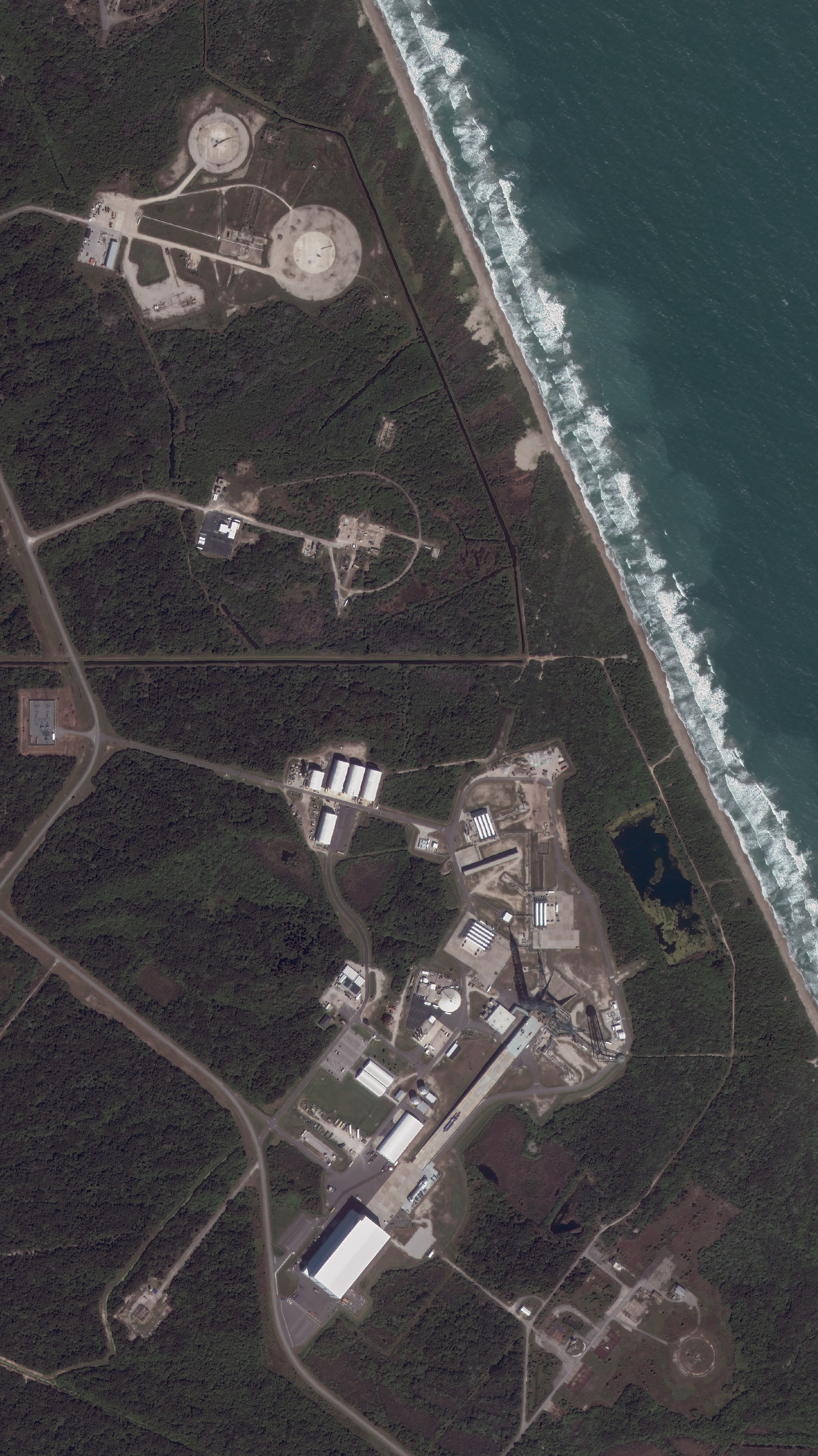
A satellite view of Launch Complex 36 in 2023, following reconstruction. Also visible are LC-12 and LC-13 to the north, and Complexes 1 through 4 to the southeast.

By October 2015, the pad design and configuration was not yet publicly known. Blue broke ground for the facility to initiate construction activity on the site in June 2016.

By March 2016, the first launch of the Blue orbital launch vehicle New Glenn was estimated to be no earlier than 2020 and that target date had not changed by the time high-level specifications for the new launcher were unveiled in September 2016, nor by the time construction of the launch site was well underway in September 2018. New Glenn will be a very large 7.0-meter (23 ft)-diameter vehicle. The first stage will be powered by seven BE-4 methane/oxygen engines producing 17.1 meganewtons (3,850,000 lbf) total thrust at launch. The first stage will be reusable and is designed to land vertically.

Blue has also leased the adjacent land—formerly known as LC-11—to use as a ground-based rocket engine test facility. Construction of the new launch complex and engine test facility was still underway in September 2018. In addition to LC-11, Blue also leased LC-12 to the north, which has been in use as a storage site for various hardware surrounding New Glenn.

Although Blue has been publicly quiet about the status of the launch complex construction, high-resolution aerial photography released after Hurricane Dorian in September 2019 showed that facility foundation work is in place—including for the horizontal integration facility, the launch service structure, lightning tower, and water tower—and above-ground steel construction has commenced. In September 2019, the propellant tank farm was in the process of being installed.

During a static fire attempt of New Glenn on May 28, 2026, in preparation for NG-4, large flashes and explosions were visible at the aft end of the booster, before it suffered a structural collapse and exploded. Significant damage was recorded to the launchpad.

== Launch statistics ==
Launch sites at Cape Canaveral Space Force Station and Kennedy Space Center
Active pads
Inactive leased pads
Inactive unleased pads
Repurposed pads, not used for launches
1 LC-39B
2 LC-39A
3 LC-48
4 SLC-41
5 SLC-40
6 LC-47
7 SLC-37
8 LC-34
9 SLC-20
10 LC-19
11 LC-16
12 LC-15
13 LC-14
14 LC-13 (LZ-2)
15 LC-12
16 LC-11
17 LC-36
18 LC-1, LC-2, LC-3, and LC-4
19 SLC-46
20 LC-21 and LC-22
21 LC-31 and LC-32
22 LC-18
23 SLC-17
24 LC-26
25 LC-5 and LC-6
26 LC-30
27 LC-25
28 LC-29

=== LC-36A ===
- Atlas-Centaur
- Atlas II
- New Glenn 7×2

==== Atlas-Centaur ====
All flights operated by NASA.

| No. | Date | Time (UTC) | Launch vehicle | Configuration | Payload | Result | Remarks |
|---|---|---|---|---|---|---|---|
| 1 | 8 May 1962 | 19:49 | Atlas-Centaur | Atlas LV-3C /Centaur-A | Suborbital test | Failure | Maiden flight of the Centaur upper stage and first launch from LC-36. Insulation panel for the Centaur detached prematurely, leading to vehicle breakup 54 seconds after launch. |
| 2 | 27 November 1963 | 19:03 | Atlas-Centaur | Atlas LV-3C /Centaur-B | Orbital test | Success | First successful launch and orbital launch from LC-36. First use of a cryogenic engine in space. |
| 3 | 30 June 1964 | 14:04 | Atlas-Centaur | Atlas LV-3C /Centaur-C | Orbital test | Failure | Hydraulics pump failure led to premature shutdown of RL10s on Centaur and failure to reach orbit. |
| 4 | 11 December 1964 | 14:25 | Atlas-Centaur | Atlas LV-3C /Centaur-C | Surveyor mass simulator | Partial failure | Flaw in Centaur ullage motor prevented engine restart from parking orbit. |
| 5 | 2 March 1965 | 13:25 | Atlas-Centaur | Atlas LV-3C /Centaur-C | Surveyor SD-1 | Failure | Mass simulator for a Surveyor lunar lander. Booster valves accidentally closed 2 seconds after launch, leading to premature engine cutoff and rocket falling back onto pad. Damage to pad forced resumption of construction and activation of LC-39B. |
| 6 | 30 May 1966 | 14:41 | Atlas-Centaur | Atlas LV-3C /Centaur-D | Surveyor 1 | Success | Part of the Surveyor program, aiming to land on the Moon in anticipation for future crewed landings. First Atlas Centaur flight with a live payload and first launch from LC-36A since the pad explosion. First American spacecraft to land on the Moon. |
| 7 | 20 September 1966 | 12:32 | Atlas-Centaur | Atlas LV-3C /Centaur-D | Surveyor 2 | Success | Part of the Surveyor program, aiming to land on the Moon in anticipation for future crewed landings. Launch was a success, but payload failed en route to destination. |
| 8 | 14 July 1967 | 11:53 | Atlas-Centaur | Atlas LV-3C /Centaur-D | Surveyor 4 | Success | Part of the Surveyor program, aiming to land on the Moon in anticipation for future crewed landings. Launch was a success, but payload crashed on the lunar surface. Final Atlas LV launch from LC-36. |
| 9 | 7 January 1968 | 06:30 | Atlas-Centaur | Atlas SLV-3C / Centaur-D | Surveyor 7 | Success | Part of the Surveyor program, aiming to land on the Moon in anticipation for future crewed landings. Final flight of the Surveyor program. |
| 10 | 10 August 1968 | 22:33 | Atlas-Centaur | Atlas SLV-3C / Centaur-D | ATS-4 | Partial failure | Part of the Applications Technology Satellites, designed to go to geosynchronous orbit. Oxidizer leak caused failure of engine restart, stranding payload in parking orbit. |
| 11 | 25 February 1969 | 01:29 | Atlas-Centaur | Atlas SLV-3C / Centaur-D | Mariner 6 | Success | Part of the Mariner program, aiming at exploring Mars. First launch from LC-36 placing payload in a heliocentric orbit. |
| 12 | 12 August 1969 | 11:01 | Atlas-Centaur | Atlas SLV-3C / Centaur-D | ATS-5 | Success | Part of the Applications Technology Satellites, designed to go to geosynchronous orbit. |
| 13 | 26 January 1971 | 00:36 | Atlas-Centaur | Atlas SLV-3C / Centaur-D | Intelsat IV F2 | Success | First commercial launch from LC-36. |
| 14 | 9 May 1971 | 01:11 | Atlas-Centaur | Atlas SLV-3C / Centaur-D | Mariner 8 | Failure | Part of the Mariner program, aiming at exploring Mars. Damaged circuitry in Centaur led to loss of control and premature engine shutdown 365 seconds after launch. |
| 15 | 20 December 1971 | 01:10 | Atlas-Centaur | Atlas SLV-3C / Centaur-D | Intelsat IV F3 | Success | |
| 16 | 3 March 1972 | 01:49 | Atlas-Centaur | Atlas SLV-3C / Centaur-D | Pioneer 10 | Success | Part of the Pioneer program, aimed at exploring Jupiter. First spacecraft to reach the outer solar system, first spacecraft to visit Jupiter, and first spacecraft to reach escape velocity of the Sun. |
| 17 | 23 August 1973 | 22:57 | Atlas-Centaur | Atlas SLV-3D / Centaur-D1A | Intelsat IV F7 | Success | |
| 18 | 20 February 1975 | 23:35 | Atlas-Centaur | Atlas SLV-3D / Centaur-D1A | Intelsat IV F6 | Failure | Improper separation of lanyard during staging led to programming reset, causing an erroneous flight path and engaging range safety protocols 413 seconds after launch. |
| 19 | 22 May 1975 | 22:04 | Atlas-Centaur | Atlas SLV-3D / Centaur-D1A | Intelsat IV F1 | Success | |
| 20 | 13 May 1976 | 22:28 | Atlas-Centaur | Atlas SLV-3D / Centaur-D1AR | Comstar D1 | Success | |
| 21 | 26 May 1977 | 21:47 | Atlas-Centaur | Atlas SLV-3D / Centaur-D1AR | Intelsat IVA F4 | Success | |
| 22 | 30 September 1977 | 01:02 | Atlas-Centaur | Atlas SLV-3D / Centaur-D1AR | Intelsat IVA F5 | Failure | Gas generator leak led to fire in thrust section during ascent, leading to RSO protocols 55 seconds after launch. |
| 23 | 9 February 1978 | 21:17 | Atlas-Centaur | Atlas SLV-3D / Centaur-D1AR | FLTSATCOM-1 | Success | Part of the Fleet Satellite Communications System for the United States Navy. First military launch from an Atlas-Centaur and first military launch from LC-36. |
| 24 | 20 May 1978 | 13:13 | Atlas-Centaur | Atlas SLV-3D / Centaur-D1AR | Pioneer Venus Orbiter | Success | Part of the Pioneer program, aimed at exploring Venus. First American spacecraft to enter Venus's orbit. |
| 25 | 8 August 1978 | 07:33 | Atlas-Centaur | Atlas SLV-3D / Centaur-D1AR | Pioneer Venus Multiprobe | Success | Part of the Pioneer program, aimed at exploring Venus. First American spacecraft to enter Venus's atmosphere. Final mission of the Pioneer program. |
| 26 | 4 May 1979 | 18:57 | Atlas-Centaur | Atlas SLV-3D / Centaur-D1AR | FLTSATCOM-2 | Success | Part of the Fleet Satellite Communications System for the United States Navy. |
| 27 | 18 January 1980 | 01:26 | Atlas-Centaur | Atlas SLV-3D / Centaur-D1AR | FLTSATCOM-3 | Success | Part of the Fleet Satellite Communications System for the United States Navy. |
| 28 | 31 October 1980 | 03:54 | Atlas-Centaur | Atlas SLV-3D / Centaur-D1AR | FLTSATCOM-4 | Success | Part of the Fleet Satellite Communications System for the United States Navy. |
| 29 | 21 February 1981 | 23:23 | Atlas-Centaur | Atlas SLV-3D / Centaur-D1AR | Comstar D4 | Success | |
| 30 | 6 August 1981 | 01:16 | Atlas-Centaur | Atlas SLV-3D / Centaur-D1AR | FLTSATCOM-5 | Partial failure | Part of the Fleet Satellite Communications System for the United States Navy. Fairing collapsed during ascent, damaging the spacecraft. |
| 31 | 5 March 1982 | 00:23 | Atlas-Centaur | Atlas SLV-3D / Centaur-D1AR | Intelsat V -504 | Success | |
| 32 | 19 May 1983 | 22:26 | Atlas-Centaur | Atlas SLV-3D / Centaur-D1AR | Intelsat V -506 | Success | Final flight of the Atlas SLV. |

==== Atlas II ====
All flights before 1994 operated by General Dynamics, from 1994 to January 1995 by Martin Marietta, and since April 1995 by Lockheed Martin.

| No. | Date | Time (UTC) | Launch vehicle | Configuration | Payload | Result | Remarks |
|---|---|---|---|---|---|---|---|
| 33 | 11 February 1992 | 00:41 | Atlas II | Atlas II | USA-78 (DSCS IIIB-14) | Success | First launch of the Atlas II from LC-36A. |
| 34 | 2 July 1992 | 21:54 | Atlas II | Atlas II | USA-82 (DSCS IIIB-12) | Success | |
| 35 | 19 July 1993 | 22:04 | Atlas II | Atlas II | USA-93 (DSCS IIIB-9) | Success | |
| 36 | 28 November 1993 | 23:40 | Atlas II | Atlas II | USA-97 (DSCS IIIB-10) | Success | |
| 37 | 3 August 1994 | 23:57 | Atlas II | Atlas IIA | DBS-2 | Success | First Atlas IIA launch from LC-36A. |
| 38 | 29 November 1994 | 10:21 | Atlas II | Atlas IIA | Orion 1 | Success | |
| 39 | 29 January 1995 | 01:25 | Atlas II | Atlas II | USA-104 (UHF F4) | Success | |
| 40 | 7 April 1995 | 23:47 | Atlas II | Atlas IIA | AMSC-1 | Success | |
| 41 | 31 May 1995 | 15:27 | Atlas II | Atlas II | USA-111 (UHF F5) | Success | |
| 42 | 31 July 1995 | 23:30 | Atlas II | Atlas IIA | USA-113 (DSCS IIIB-7) | Success | |
| 43 | 22 October 1995 | 08:00 | Atlas II | Atlas II | USA-114 (UHF F4) | Success | |
| 44 | 15 December 1995 | 00:23 | Atlas II | Atlas IIA | Galaxy 3R | Success | |
| 45 | 3 April 1996 | 23:01 | Atlas II | Atlas IIA | Inmarsat 3-F1 | Success | |
| 46 | 25 July 1996 | 12:42 | Atlas II | Atlas II | USA-127 (UHF F7) | Success | |
| 47 | 21 November 1996 | 20:47 | Atlas II | Atlas IIA | Hot Bird 2 | Success | |
| 48 | 8 March 1997 | 06:01 | Atlas II | Atlas IIA | Tempo 2 | Success | |
| 49 | 4 September 1997 | 12:03 | Atlas II | Atlas IIAS | AMC-3 | Success | First Atlas IIAS launch from LC-36A. |
| 50 | 25 October 1997 | 00:46 | Atlas II | Atlas IIA | USA-135 (DSCS IIIB-13) | Success | |
| 51 | 29 January 1998 | 18:37 | Atlas II | Atlas IIA | NROL-5 | Success | NRO launch. SDS satellite, also known as USA-137. First launch from LC-36 acknowledged by the National Reconnaissance Office. |
| 52 | 16 March 1998 | 21:32 | Atlas II | Atlas II | USA-138 (UHF F8) | Success | Final flight of the baseline Atlas II. |
| 53 | 18 June 1998 | 22:48 | Atlas II | Atlas IIAS | Intelsat 805 | Success | |
| 54 | 20 October 1998 | 07:19 | Atlas II | Atlas IIA | USA-140 (UHF F9 | Success | |
| 55 | 16 February 1999 | 01:45 | Atlas II | Atlas IIAS | JCSAT-6 | Success | |
| 56 | 12 April 1999 | 22:50 | Atlas II | Atlas IIAS | Eutelsat W3 | Success | |
| 57 | 23 September 1999 | 06:02 | Atlas II | Atlas IIAS | Echostar 5 | Success | |
| 58 | 21 January 2000 | 01:03 | Atlas II | Atlas IIA | USA-148 (DSCS IIIB-8) | Success | |
| 59 | 3 May 2000 | 07:07 | Atlas II | Atlas IIA | GOES-11 | Success | Launched as GOES-L. Part of the Geostationary Operational Environmental Satellites system of satellites. |
| 60 | 30 June 2000 | 12:56 | Atlas II | Atlas IIA | TDRS-8 | Success | Launched as TDRS-H. Part of the Tracking and Data Relay Satellite System. First TDRS launch from LC-36, and first unmanned TDRS launch. |
| 61 | 20 October 2000 | 00:40 | Atlas II | Atlas IIA | USA-153 (DSCS IIIB-11) | Success | |
| 62 | 6 December 2000 | 02:47 | Atlas II | Atlas IIAS | NROL-10 | Success | NRO launch. SDS satellite, also known as USA-155. |
| 63 | 23 July 2001 | 07:23 | Atlas II | Atlas IIA | GOES-12 | Success | Launched as GOES-M. Part of the Geostationary Operational Environmental Satellites system of satellites. |
| 64 | 8 March 2002 | 22:59 | Atlas II | Atlas IIA | TDRS-9 | Success | Launched as TDRS-I. Part of the Tracking and Data Relay Satellite System. |
| 65 | 18 September 2002 | 22:04 | Atlas II | Atlas IIAS | Hispasat 1D | Success | |
| 66 | 5 December 2002 | 02:42 | Atlas II | Atlas IIA | TDRS-10 | Success | Launched as TDRS-J. Part of the Tracking and Data Relay Satellite System. Final flight of the Atlas IIA. |
| 67 | 5 February 2004 | 23:46 | Atlas II | Atlas IIAS | AMC-10 | Success | |
| 68 | 16 April 2004 | 00:45 | Atlas II | Atlas IIAS | Superbird 6 | Success | Launch was a success, but gravitational perturbations by the Moon caused a lower than expected perigee and permanent damage to satellite. |
| 69 | 31 August 2004 | 23:17 | Atlas II | Atlas IIAS | NROL-1 | Success | NRO launch. SDS satellite, also known as USA-179. Final flight of the Atlas II, and final flight from LC-36A prior to Blue Origin's pad reconfiguration. |

==== New Glenn ====
All flights operated by Blue Origin.

| No. | Date | Time (UTC) | Launch vehicle | Booster | Payload | Result | Remarks |
|---|---|---|---|---|---|---|---|
| 70 | 16 January 2025 | 07:03 | New Glenn 7×2 | 1 | Blue Ring Pathfinder | Success | Maiden flight of New Glenn and first orbital launch for Blue Origin. First launch from LC-36 following complex rebuilding. Carried a prototype Blue Ring spacecraft. Originally supposed to fly the two ESCAPADE probes, but payloads switched following development issues with rocket. Booster landing failed during entry burn. |
| 71 | 13 November 2025 | 20:55 | New Glenn 7×2 | 2-1 | ESCAPADE | Success | Part of the SIMPLEx program, two orbiters designed to study the magnetosphere and atmosphere of Mars. First New Glenn launch into heliocentric orbit, and first successful booster landing by a non-SpaceX launch vehicle. |
| 72 | 19 April 2026 | 11:25 | New Glenn 7×2 | 2-2 | BlueBird 7 | Failure | First commercial launch for New Glenn, and first reflight of a non-SpaceX first stage, previously flown in 2025 as part of ESCAPADE. Second stage issue placed satellite into incorrect orbit and forced it to conduct a controlled reentry. Final launch from LC-36 before a pad explosion on May 28 severely damaged the pad and forced reconstruction. |

==== Upcoming launches ====
| Date | Launch vehicle | Payload |
|---|---|---|
| January 2027 | New Glenn 7×2 | Blue Ring 1 |
| Q1 2027 | New Glenn 7×2 | LeoSat LN-01 |
| Q1 2027 | New Glenn 7×2 | Blue Moon Pathfinder Mission 1 |

=== LC-36B ===
- Atlas-Centaur
- Atlas G
- Atlas I
- Atlas II
- Atlas III
- New Glenn 9×4

==== Atlas-Centaur and Atlas G ====
All flights operated by NASA.

| No. | Date | Time (UTC) | Launch vehicle | Configuration | Payload | Result | Remarks |
|---|---|---|---|---|---|---|---|
| 1 | 11 August 1965 | 14:31 | Atlas-Centaur | Atlas LV-3C /Centaur-D | Surveyor SD-2 | Success | Mass simulator for a Surveyor lunar lander. First launch from LC-39B. First fully successful flight of a Surveyor mass simulator. |
| 2 | 8 April 1966 | 01:00 | Atlas-Centaur | Atlas LV-3C /Centaur-D | Surveyor SD-3 | Success | Mass simulator for a Surveyor lunar lander. Centaur prematurely depleted ullage propellant, preventing engine restart. |
| 3 | 26 October 1966 | 11:12 | Atlas-Centaur | Atlas LV-3C /Centaur-D | Surveyor SD-4 | Success | Mass simulator for a Surveyor lunar lander. First ever restart of a cryogenic engine in orbit. |
| 4 | 17 April 1967 | 07:05 | Atlas-Centaur | Atlas LV-3C /Centaur-D | Surveyor 3 | Success | Part of the Surveyor program, aiming to land on the Moon in anticipation for future crewed landings. First launch of a live payload from LC-36B. First and only to date spacecraft to visited by astronauts on another celestial object, being visited by Apollo 12 in 1969 to demonstrate the feasibility of making a moonbase. |
| 5 | 8 September 1967 | 07:57 | Atlas-Centaur | Atlas SLV-3C / Centaur-D | Surveyor 5 | Success | Part of the Surveyor program, aiming to land on the Moon in anticipation for future crewed landings. First Atlas SLV launch from LC-36. |
| 6 | 7 November 1967 | 07:39 | Atlas-Centaur | Atlas SLV-3C / Centaur-D | Surveyor 6 | Success | Part of the Surveyor program, aiming to land on the Moon in anticipation for future crewed landings. |
| 7 | 7 December 1968 | 08:40 | Atlas-Centaur | Atlas SLV-3C / Centaur-D | OAO-2 | Success | Part of the Orbiting Astronomical Observatory series of space telescopes. First ever successful launch of a space telescope. |
| 8 | 27 March 1969 | 22:22 | Atlas-Centaur | Atlas SLV-3C / Centaur-D | Mariner 7 | Success | Part of the Mariner program, aiming at exploring Mars. |
| 9 | 30 November 1970 | 22:40 | Atlas-Centaur | Atlas SLV-3C / Centaur-D | OAO-B | Failure | Part of the Orbiting Astronomical Observatory series of space telescopes. Payload fairings failed to separate, causing failure to reach orbit. |
| 10 | 30 May 1971 | 22:23 | Atlas-Centaur | Atlas SLV-3C / Centaur-D | Mariner 9 | Success | Part of the Mariner program, aiming at exploring Mars. Became the first ever satellite to enter orbit of another planet. |
| 11 | 23 January 1972 | 00:12 | Atlas-Centaur | Atlas SLV-3C / Centaur-D | Intelsat IV F4 | Success | |
| 12 | 13 June 1972 | 21:53 | Atlas-Centaur | Atlas SLV-3C / Centaur-D | Intelsat IV F5 | Success | |
| 13 | 21 August 1972 | 10:28 | Atlas-Centaur | Atlas SLV-3C / Centaur-D | OAO-3 | Success | Part of the Orbiting Astronomical Observatory series of space telescopes. |
| 14 | 6 April 1973 | 02:11 | Atlas-Centaur | Atlas SLV-3D / Centaur-D1A | Pioneer 11 | Success | Part of the Pioneer program, aimed at exploring Jupiter and Saturn. First spacecraft to visit Saturn, and second spacecraft to reach solar escape velocity. |
| 15 | 3 November 1973 | 05:45 | Atlas-Centaur | Atlas SLV-3D / Centaur-D1A | Mariner 10 | Success | Part of the Mariner program, aiming at exploring Venus and Mercury. First spacecraft to visit Mercury and first spacecraft to take pictures of Venus from space. Final mission of the Mariner program. |
| 16 | 21 November 1974 | 23:43 | Atlas-Centaur | Atlas SLV-3D / Centaur-D1A | Intelsat IV F8 | Success | |
| 17 | 26 September 1975 | 00:17 | Atlas-Centaur | Atlas SLV-3D / Centaur-D1AR | Intelsat IVA F1 | Success | |
| 18 | 29 January 1976 | 23:56 | Atlas-Centaur | Atlas SLV-3D / Centaur-D1AR | Intelsat IVA F2 | Success | |
| 19 | 22 July 1976 | 22:04 | Atlas-Centaur | Atlas SLV-3D / Centaur-D1AR | Comstar D2 | Success | |
| 20 | 12 August 1977 | 21:47 | Atlas-Centaur | Atlas SLV-3D / Centaur-D1AR | HEAO-1 | Success | Part of the HEAO Program, space telescopes designed to observe x-ray astronomy. |
| 21 | 7 January 1978 | 00:15 | Atlas-Centaur | Atlas SLV-3D / Centaur-D1AR | Intelsat IVA F3 | Success | |
| 22 | 31 March 1978 | 23:36 | Atlas-Centaur | Atlas SLV-3D / Centaur-D1AR | Intelsat IVA F6 | Success | |
| 23 | 29 June 1978 | 22:24 | Atlas-Centaur | Atlas SLV-3D / Centaur-D1AR | Comstar D3 | Success | |
| 24 | 13 November 1978 | 05:24 | Atlas-Centaur | Atlas SLV-3D / Centaur-D1AR | Einstein Observatory | Success | Part of the HEAO Program, space telescopes designed to observe x-ray astronomy. |
| 25 | 20 September 1979 | 05:28 | Atlas-Centaur | Atlas SLV-3D / Centaur-D1AR | HEAO-3 | Success | Part of the HEAO Program, space telescopes designed to observe x-ray astronomy. |
| 26 | 6 December 1980 | 23:31 | Atlas-Centaur | Atlas SLV-3D / Centaur-D1AR | Intelsat V F-2 | Success | |
| 27 | 23 May 1981 | 22:42 | Atlas-Centaur | Atlas SLV-3D / Centaur-D1AR | Intelsat V F-1 | Success | |
| 28 | 15 December 1981 | 23:35 | Atlas-Centaur | Atlas SLV-3D / Centaur-D1AR | Intelsat V F-3 | Success | |
| 29 | 28 September 1982 | 23:17 | Atlas-Centaur | Atlas SLV-3D / Centaur-D1AR | Intelsat V -505 | Success | Final Atlas SLV launch from LC-36B. |
| 30 | 9 June 1984 | 23:03 | Atlas G | Atlas G / Centaur-D1AR | Intelsat V -509 | Failure | Maiden flight of the Atlas G. Centaur LOX tank ruptured during coasting phase, leading to loss of rocket. |
| 31 | 22 March 1985 | 23:55 | Atlas G | Atlas G / Centaur-D1AR | Intelsat V -510 | Success | |
| 32 | 30 June 1985 | 00:44 | Atlas G | Atlas G / Centaur-D1AR | Intelsat V -511 | Success | |
| 33 | 28 September 1985 | 23:17 | Atlas G | Atlas G / Centaur-D1AR | Intelsat V -512 | Success | |
| 34 | 5 December 1986 | 02:30 | Atlas G | Atlas G / Centaur-D1AR | USA-20 (FLTSATCOM-7) | Success | Part of the Fleet Satellite Communications System for the United States Navy. |
| 35 | 26 March 1987 | 21:22 | Atlas G | Atlas G / Centaur-D1AR | FLTSATCOM-6 | Failure | Part of the Fleet Satellite Communications System for the United States Navy. Launched during a thunderstorm and was struck by lightning, damaging guidance and causing an erroneous pitch maneuver that led to vehicle breakup. |
| 36 | 25 September 1989 | 08:56 | Atlas G | Atlas G / Centaur-D1AR | USA-46 (FLTSATCOM-8) | Success | Part of the Fleet Satellite Communications System for the United States Navy. Final flight of the Atlas G. |

==== Atlas I, II, and III ====
All flights before 1994 operated by General Dynamics, from 1994 to January 1995 by Martin Marietta, and since March 1995 by Lockheed Martin.

| No. | Date | Time (UTC) | Launch vehicle | Configuration | Payload | Result | Remarks |
|---|---|---|---|---|---|---|---|
| 37 | 25 July 1990 | 19:21 | Atlas I | Atlas I | CRRES | Success | Joint NASA-DoD satellite aimed at studying Earth's magnetosphere. Maiden flight of the Atlas I. |
| 38 | 18 April 1991 | 23:30 | Atlas I | Atlas I | BS-3H | Failure | Frozen nitrogen formed a plug that caused failure of one RL10 during staging, activating RSO protocols 441 seconds after launch. |
| 39 | 7 December 1991 | 22:47 | Atlas II | Atlas II | Eutelsat 2F3 | Success | Maiden flight of the Atlas II. |
| 40 | 14 March 1992 | 00:00 | Atlas I | Atlas I | Galaxy 5 | Success | |
| 41 | 10 June 1992 | 00:00 | Atlas II | Atlas IIA | Intelsat K | Success | Maiden flight of the Atlas IIA. |
| 42 | 22 August 1992 | 22:40 | Atlas I | Atlas I | Galaxy 1R | Failure | Frozen nitrogen formed a plug that caused failure of one RL10 during staging, activating RSO protocols 470 seconds after launch. |
| 43 | 25 March 1993 | 21:38 | Atlas I | Atlas I | UHF F1 | Failure | Improper torque led to loss of thrust in sustainer engine, eventually causing payload to be placed in an unusable orbit. |
| 44 | 3 September 1993 | 11:17 | Atlas I | Atlas I | USA-95 (UHF F2) | Success | |
| 45 | 16 December 1993 | 00:38 | Atlas II | Atlas IIAS | Telstar 401 | Success | Maiden flight of the Atlas IIAS. |
| 46 | 13 April 1994 | 06:04 | Atlas I | Atlas I | GOES-8 | Success | Launched as GOES-I. Part of the Geostationary Operational Environmental Satellites system of satellites. First GOES launch on an Atlas rocket. First Atlas flight following Martin Marietta's purchase of General Dynamics' space division. |
| 47 | 24 June 1994 | 13:50 | Atlas I | Atlas I | USA-104 (UHF F3) | Success | |
| 48 | 6 October 1994 | 06:35 | Atlas II | Atlas IIAS | Intelsat 703 | Success | |
| 49 | 10 January 1995 | 06:18 | Atlas II | Atlas IIAS | Intelsat 704 | Success | First Atlas launch procured by International Launch Services. |
| 50 | 22 March 1995 | 06:18 | Atlas II | Atlas IIAS | Intelsat 705 | Success | First Altas launch following Lockheed and Martin Marietta's merging into Lockheed Martin. |
| 51 | 23 May 1995 | 05:52 | Atlas I | Atlas I | GOES-9 | Success | Launched as GOES-J. Part of the Geostationary Operational Environmental Satellites system of satellites. |
| 52 | 29 August 1995 | 00:53 | Atlas II | Atlas IIAS | JCSAT-3 | Success | |
| 53 | 2 December 1995 | 08:08 | Atlas II | Atlas IIAS | SOHO | Success | Part of the Horizon 2000 program, aimed at observing the Sun from the L_{1} Lagrange point. First launch for ESA from LC-36. |
| 54 | 1 February 1996 | 01:15 | Atlas II | Atlas IIAS | Palapa C1 | Success | |
| 55 | 30 April 1996 | 04:31 | Atlas I | Atlas I | BeppoSAX | Success | Space telescope aimed at detecting x-ray sources, helping detect gamma-ray burst sources. Partnership between the ASI and NIVR. |
| 56 | 8 September 1996 | 21:49 | Atlas II | Atlas IIA | GE-1 | Success | |
| 57 | 18 December 1996 | 01:57 | Atlas II | Atlas IIA | Inmarsat 3-F3 | Success | |
| 58 | 17 February 1997 | 01:42 | Atlas II | Atlas IIAS | JCSAT-4 | Success | |
| 59 | 25 April 1997 | 05:49 | Atlas I | Atlas I | GOES-10 | Success | Launched as GOES-K. Part of the Geostationary Operational Environmental Satellites system of satellites. Last flight of the Atlas I. |
| 60 | 28 July 1997 | 01:15 | Atlas II | Atlas IIAS | Superbird-C | Success | |
| 61 | 5 October 1997 | 21:01 | Atlas II | Atlas IIAS | Echostar 3 | Success | |
| 62 | 8 December 1997 | 23:52 | Atlas II | Atlas IIAS | Galaxy 8i | Success | |
| 63 | 28 February 1998 | 00:21 | Atlas II | Atlas IIAS | Intelsat 806 | Success | |
| 64 | 9 October 1998 | 22:50 | Atlas II | Atlas IIA | Hot Bird 5 | Success | |
| 65 | 23 November 1999 | 04:06 | Atlas II | Atlas IIA | USA-146 (UHF F10) | Success | |
| 66 | 3 February 2000 | 23:30 | Atlas II | Atlas IIAS | Hispasat 1C | Success | |
| 67 | 23 May 2000 | 23:10 | Atlas III | Atlas IIIA | Eutelsat W4 | Success | Maiden flight of the Atlas III, and first orbital Atlas flight without the stage and a half design of the core stage. |
| 68 | 14 July 2000 | 05:21 | Atlas II | Atlas IIAS | Echostar 6 | Success | |
| 69 | 19 June 2001 | 04:41 | Atlas II | Atlas IIAS | ICO F2 | Success | |
| 70 | 11 October 2001 | 02:32 | Atlas II | Atlas IIAS | NROL-12 | Success | NRO launch. SDS satellite, also known as USA-162. |
| 71 | 21 February 2002 | 12:43 | Atlas III | Atlas IIIB | Echostar 7 | Success | Maiden flight of the Atlas IIIB. |
| 72 | 12 April 2003 | 00:47 | Atlas III | Atlas IIIB | Asiasat 4 | Success | |
| 73 | 18 December 2003 | 02:30 | Atlas III | Atlas IIIB | UFO 11 | Success | |
| 74 | 13 March 2004 | 05:40 | Atlas III | Atlas IIIA | MBSAT-1 | Success | Final launch of the Atlas IIIA. |
| 75 | 19 May 2004 | 22:22 | Atlas II | Atlas IIAS | AMC-11 | Success | Final Atlas II launch from LC-36B. |
| 76 | 3 February 2005 | 07:41 | Atlas III | Atlas IIIB | NROL-23 | Success | NRO launch. Two Intruder satellites, sharing the designation USA-181. Final flight of the Atlas III, and final Atlas launch from LC-36. Final flight from LC-36 prior to Blue Origin's pad reconfiguration. Most recent launch from LC-36B. |

== Gallery ==
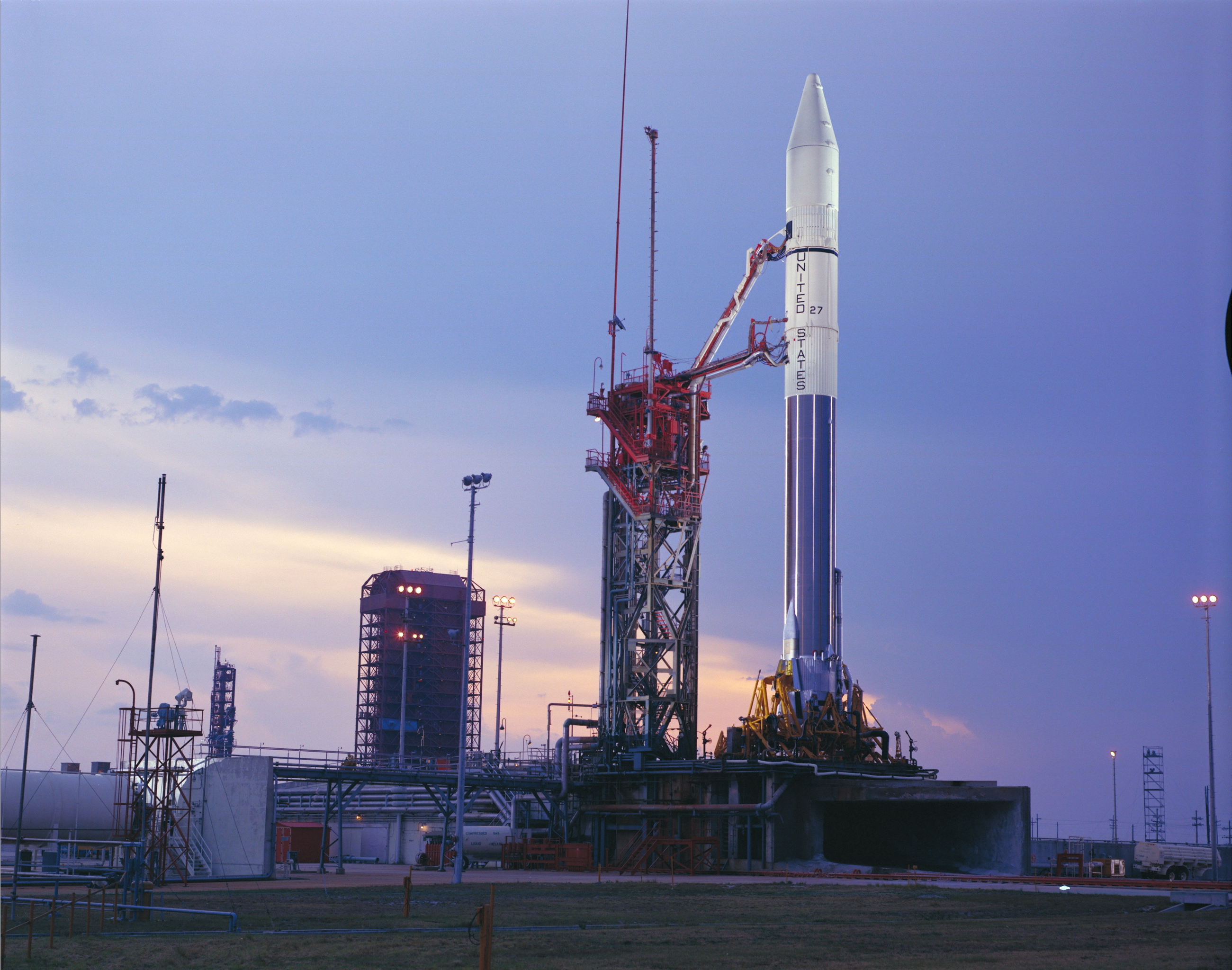
An Atlas-Centaur at LC-36A prior to the launch of Pioneer 10.

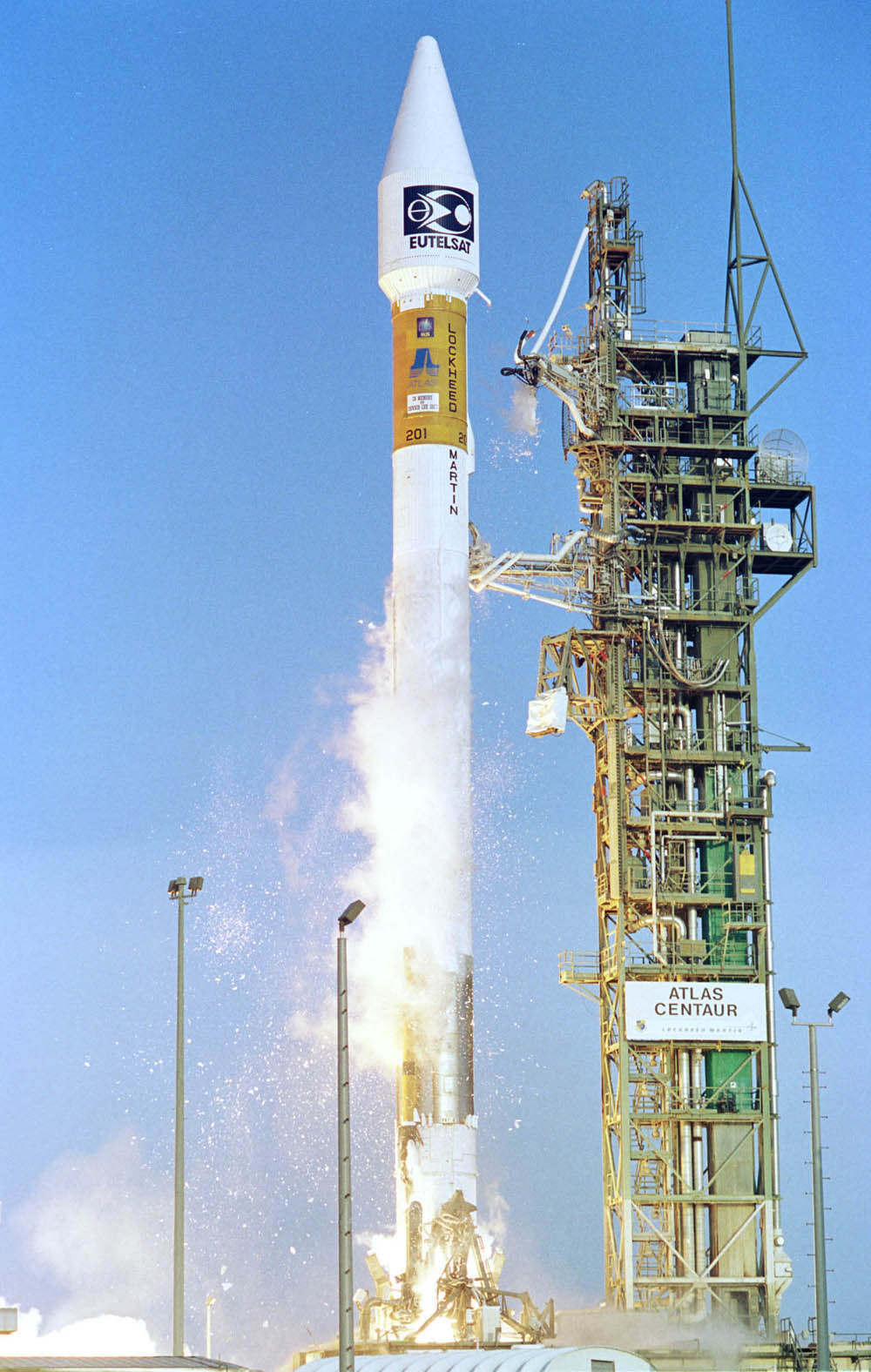
An Atlas III launches from LC-36B.

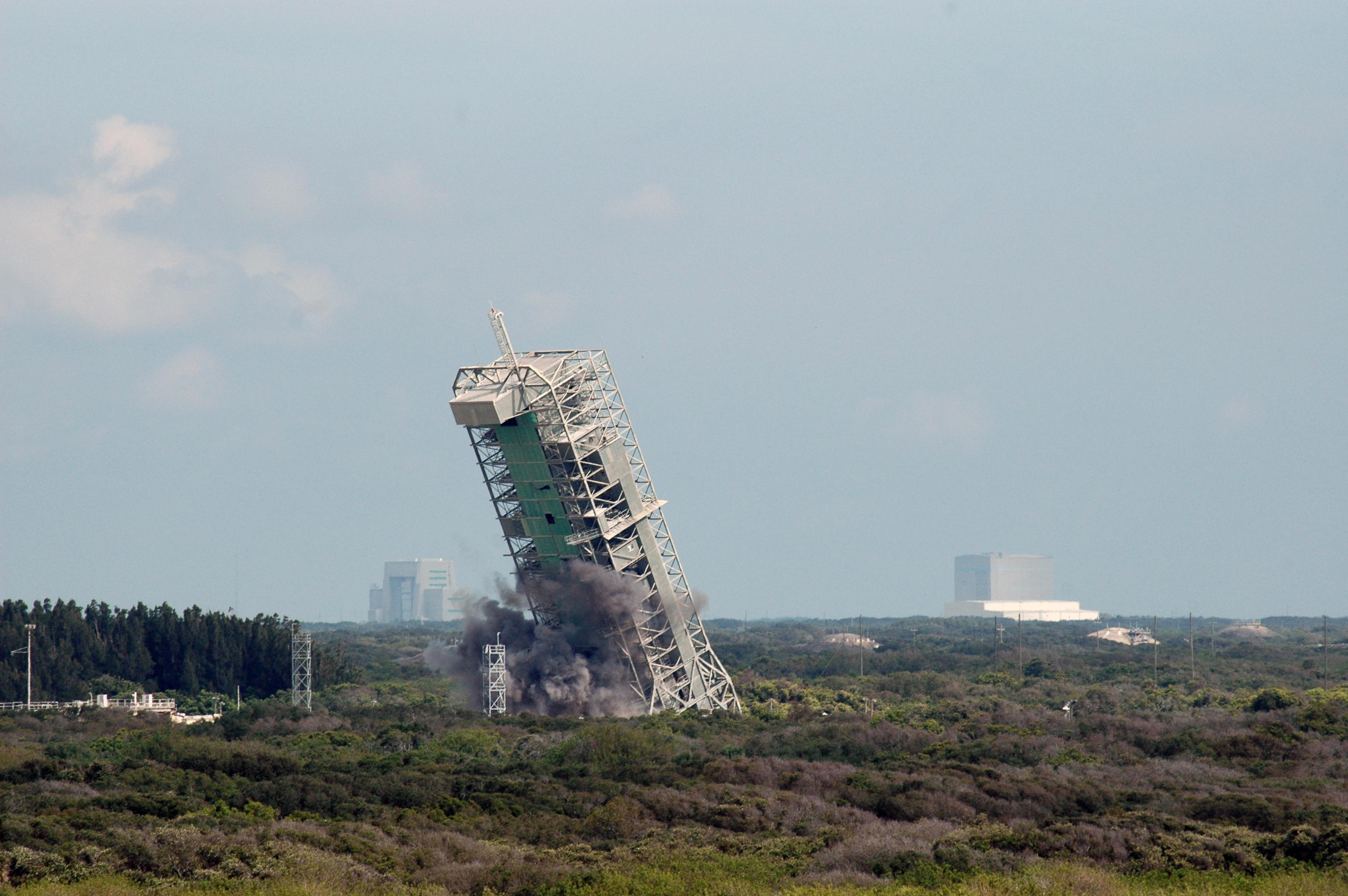
The MSS of Launch Complex 36A falls to the ground after critical supports are destroyed in a controlled explosion.

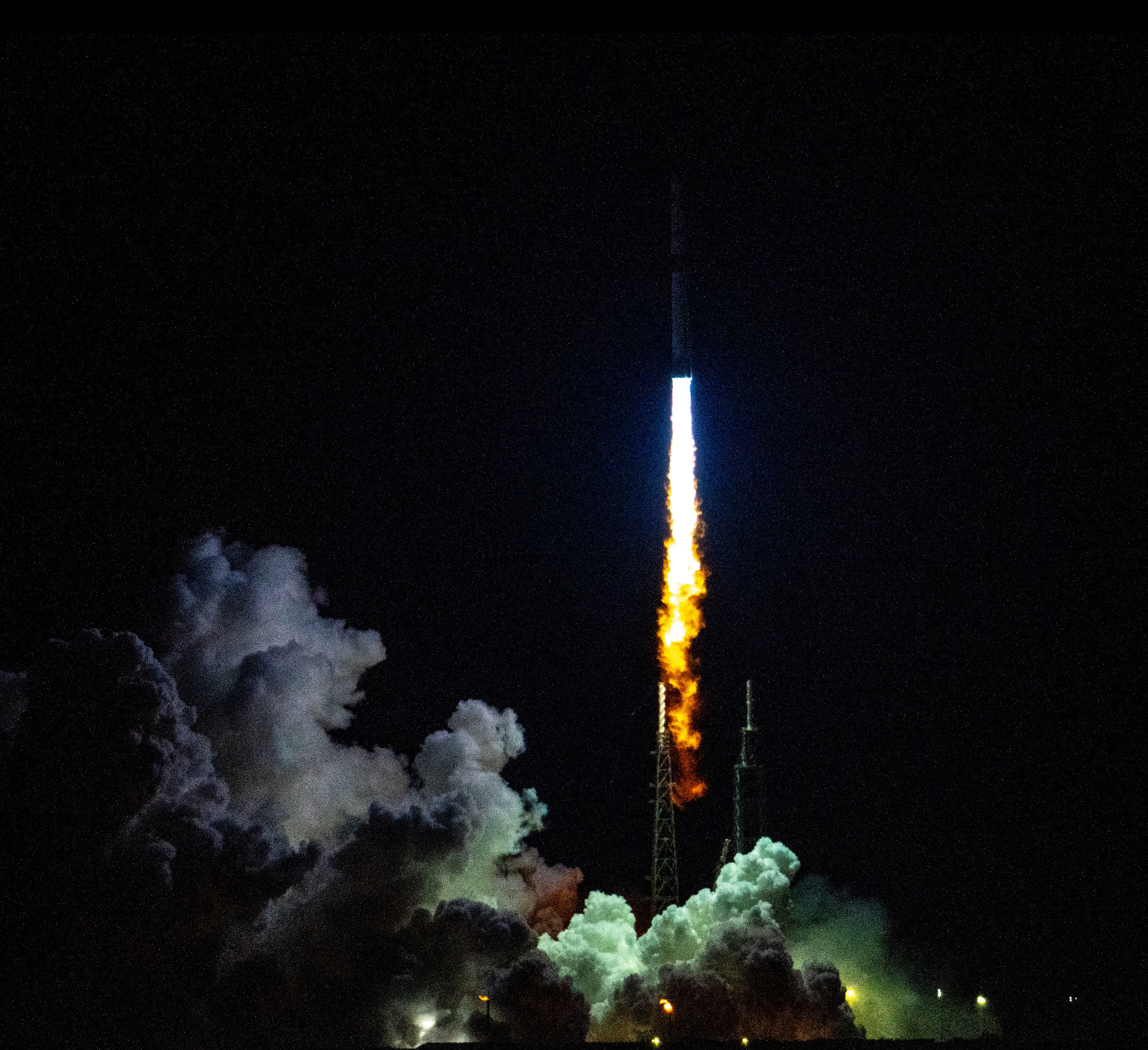
LC-36 hosting the maiden flight of New Glenn.

== See also ==
- List of Cape Canaveral and Merritt Island launch sites
