= Intelsat IVA F-2 =

Geostationary communications satellite

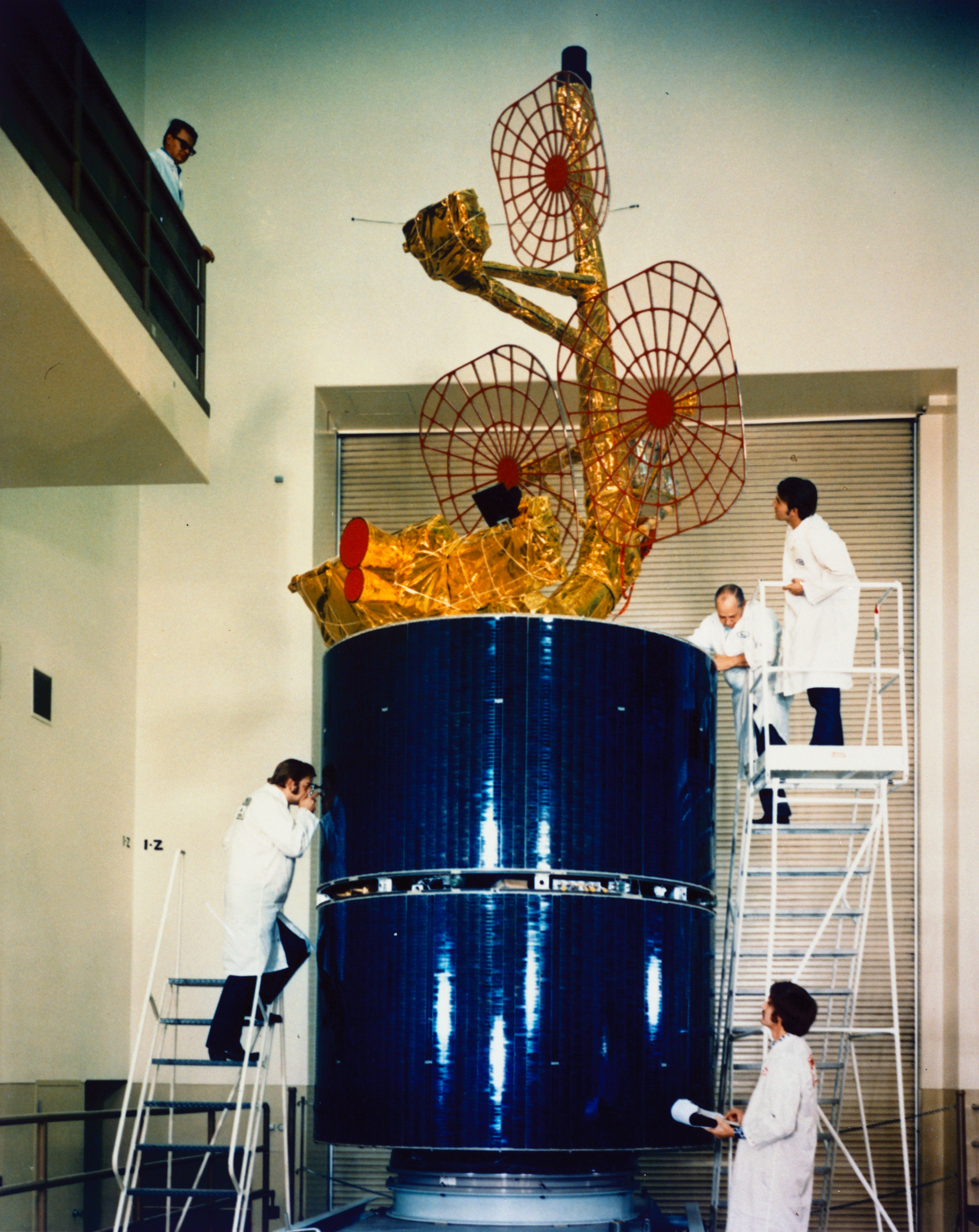
- Intelsat IVA F-2 before launch.
- Mission type: Communications
- Operator: Intelsat
- COSPAR ID: 1976-010A
- SATCAT no.: 08620
- Mission duration: 7 years design life

Spacecraft properties
- Bus: HS-353
- Manufacturer: Hughes Communications
- Launch mass: 1,515 kilograms (3,340 lb)
- BOL mass: 825 kilograms (1,819 lb)

Start of mission
- Launch date: 29 January 1976, 23:56 UTC
- Rocket: Atlas SLV-3D Centaur-D1AR
- Launch site: Cape Canaveral LC-36B
- Contractor: NASA

End of mission
- Disposal: Decommissioned

Orbital parameters
- Reference system: Geocentric
- Regime: Geostationary
- Eccentricity: 0.00938
- Perigee altitude: 35,084 kilometres (21,800 mi)
- Apogee altitude: 35,869 kilometres (22,288 mi)
- Inclination: 0.1 degrees
- Period: 1,420.2 minutes
- Epoch: 29 January 1976

Transponders
- Band: 20 IEEE C-band (NATO G/H-band)

Intelsat IVA F-2 was a geostationary communication satellite built by Hughes, it was owned by Intelsat. The satellite was based on the HS-353 platform and its estimated useful life was 7 years.

== History ==
The Intelsat IVA F-2 was part of the Intelsat IVA series which consisted of 6 satellites, of which five were successfully placed into orbit. All five satellites in the series were retired and operated an average of almost 4 years beyond their life expectancies. The satellite antenna allowed coverage from the land masses on both sides of the Atlantic basin with four point beams and had sufficient insulation between the east beams and the western beams that used the same frequencies in the east and west. The separation of the beam by directional antenna allowed this dual use of the frequency, significantly increasing the capacity of satellite communication within an assigned frequency range. Although the initial requirement Intelsat VAT series was only for the Atlantic service, but also was given special attention during the project to provide service on the Indian Ocean and Pacific Ocean.

The satellite had 20 transponders (individual radio transmitters) compared to 12 on board each Intelsat IV satellite. It had a total height of 22 feet 11 inches (6.99 meters) and a diameter of 7 feet 9 inches (2.36 meters). The solar panels, covered with about 17,000 solar cells, provided primary energy of 600 Watts. The weight of the satellite, which had an orbiting life project of 7 years, was about 3,335 pounds (1,513 kg).

The satellite was successfully launched into space on January 29, 1976, by means of an Atlas-Centaur vehicle from the Cape Canaveral Air Force Station, United States. It had a launch mass of 1,515 kg.

== See also ==
- Intelsat
