= FLTSATCOM-3 =

FLTSATCOM-3 or (FSC-3) was the third vehicle in the Navy's FLTSATCOM communications satellite constellation, which were used by the United States Navy for communications between aircraft, ships, submarines and ground stations. Fltsatcom 3 provided 28 5-kHz and 11 20-kHz communications channels simultaneously in the UHF band. The UHF up-link was in the 290 to 320 MHz range while down-link was in the 240 to 270 MHz range. A number of channels were reserved for high priority communications by the United States Air Force. These were ground to air communications between SAC aircraft, the E-3A airborne warning and control system and elements of the presidential command structure. FSC-3's life officially ended in September 1995.

FSC 3 was launched on 18 January 1980 at 01:26 UTC on an Atlas-Centaur rocket. The launch took place at Cape Canaveral, Florida. The initial transfer orbit was at an inclination of 26.2 degrees. It had a periapsis of 171 km and an apoapsis of 3,524 km and an orbital period of 619 minutes. The orbit was circularized at the operational geosynchronous altitude by a solid propellant apogee kick motor (AKM).

The satellite's main body was 1.7 meters high by 2.7 meters in diameter and a hexagonal shape. The FLTSATCOM satellites had a 5.3 meter wire mesh parabolic transmit antenna with a 2-meter solid center section. The receive antenna was a helical coil mounted on a deployed boom off to one side. They were triaxial stabilized satellites, utilizing a reaction control wheel instead of spin stabilization. The satellites produced 1.1 kW DC, using 2 three-section solar panels mounted on booms extending from the satellite. The craft used Nickel–cadmium batteries for power during solar eclipses. When they were originally launched, the FSC satellites were the heaviest communications satellite used by the United States military, exceeding TacSat-1 by over 100 kg.
