= Orbiting Astronomical Observatory 3 =

Space telescope intended for ultraviolet and X-ray observation

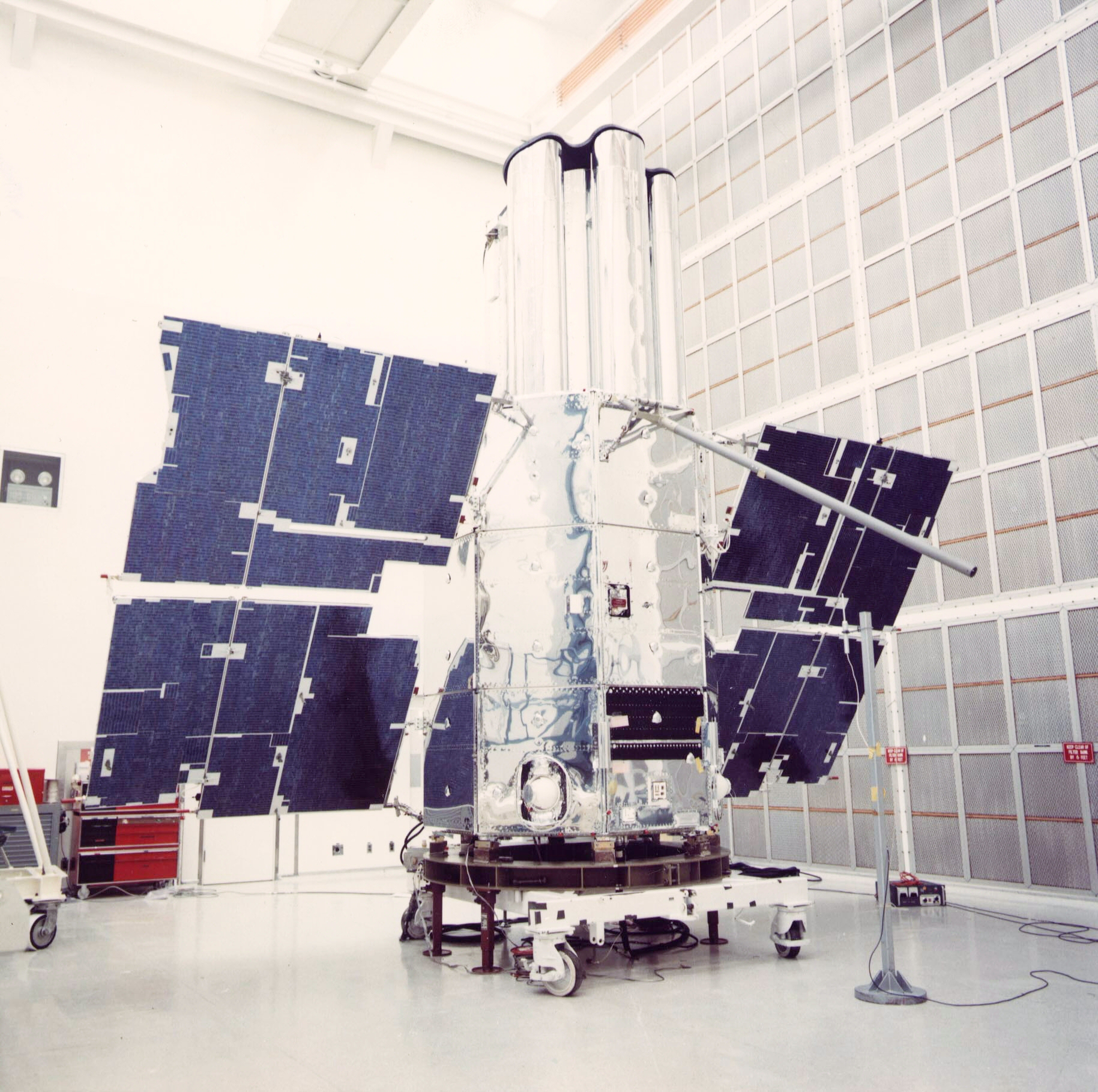
- Orbiting Astronomical Observatory 3 in a clean room before launch.
- Names: OAO-3, Copernicus, OAO-C, Orbiting Astronomical Observatory-C, PL-701D
- Mission type: Astronomy
- Operator: NASA, SERC
- COSPAR ID: 1972-065A
- SATCAT no.: 06153

Spacecraft properties
- Dry mass: 2,204 kilograms (4,859 lb)

Start of mission
- Launch date: 21 August 1972 UTC
- Rocket: Atlas SLV-3C Centaur-D
- Launch site: Cape Canaveral LC-36B

End of mission
- Deactivated: February 1981

Orbital parameters
- Reference system: Geocentric
- Regime: Low Earth
- Perigee altitude: 713 kilometres (443 mi)
- Apogee altitude: 724 kilometres (450 mi)
- Inclination: 35.0 degrees
- Period: 99.2 minutes

Copernicus or OAO-3 (Orbiting Astronomical Observatory 3), also mentioned as Orbiting Astronomical Observatory-C, was a space telescope intended for ultraviolet and X-ray observation. After its launch, it was named Copernicus to mark the 500th anniversary of the birth of Nicolaus Copernicus in 1473.

Part of the Orbiting Astronomical Observatory program, it was a collaborative effort between NASA and the UK's Science Research Council (currently known as the Science and Engineering Research Council).

Copernicus collected high-resolution spectra of hundreds of stars, galaxies and planets, remaining in service until February 1981.

== History ==
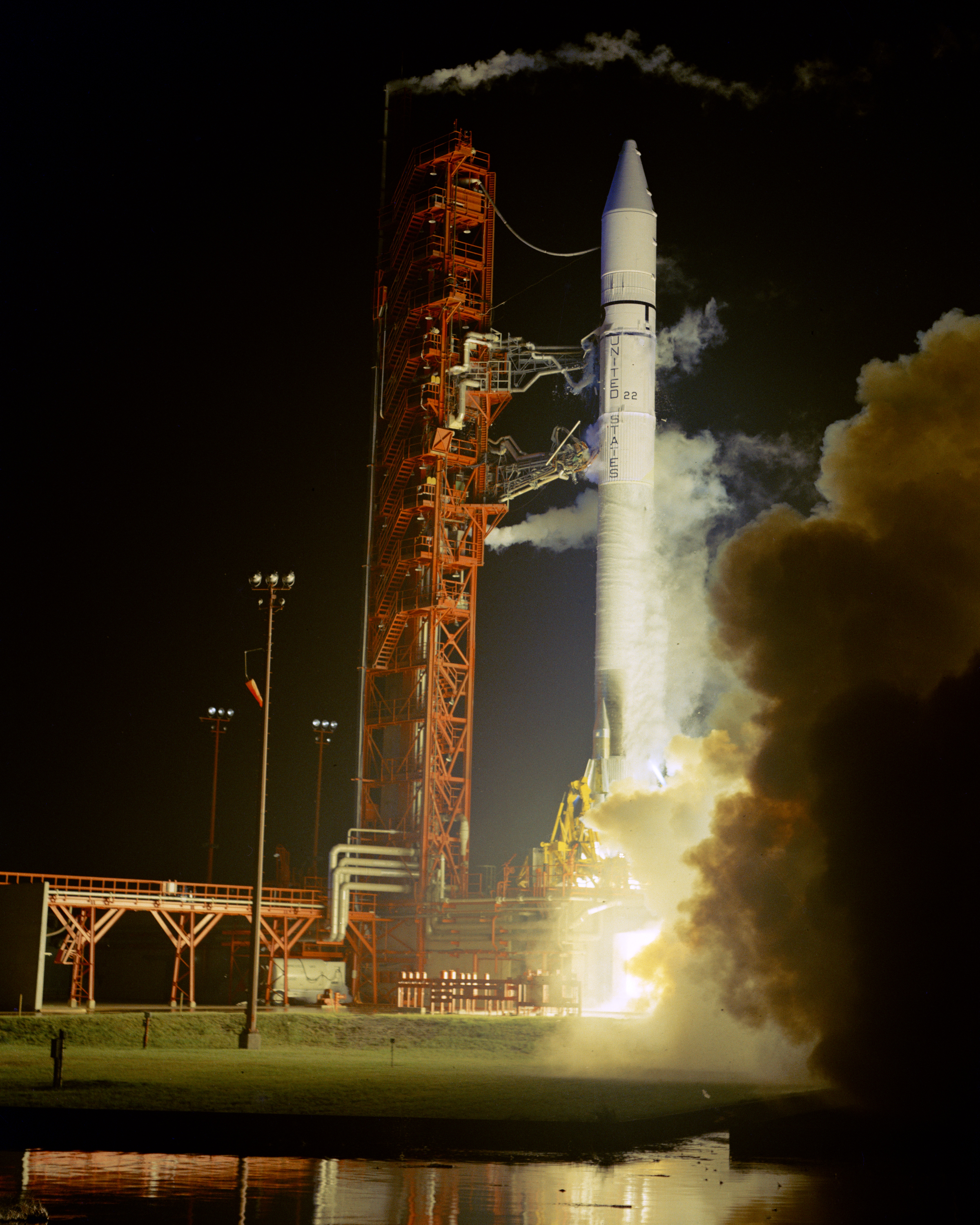
At 6:28 a.m. EDT on Aug. 21, 1972, Copernicus lifted off from Complex 36B at Cape Canaveral Air Force Station, Florida.

The OAO-3 satellite, weighing 2,150 kg, was launched on August 21, 1972, by an Atlas SLV-3C from Launch Complex 36, Cape Canaveral, Florida.

The mission used a new inertial reference unit that was developed by the Massachusetts Institute of Technology.

Between 1972 and February 1981, it returned high-resolution spectra of 551 stars along with extensive X-ray observations. Among the significant discoveries made by Copernicus were the discovery of several long-period pulsars such as X Persei that had rotation times of many minutes instead of the more typical second or less, and confirmation that most of the hydrogen in interstellar gas clouds existed in molecular form.

== Instrumentation ==
Copernicus carried two instruments:

- an X-ray detector built by University College London's Mullard Space Science Laboratory;
- an 80 cm UV telescope built by Princeton University under the supervision of Lyman Spitzer.

== See also ==
- Orbiting Astronomical Observatory
- Orbiting Solar Observatory
