= Intelsat V F-2 =

Communications Satellite

Intelsat V F-2 → Intelsat 502
- Mission type: Communication
- Operator: COMSAT / Intelsat
- COSPAR ID: 1980-098A
- SATCAT no.: 12089
- Mission duration: 7 years (planned)

Spacecraft properties
- Bus: Intelsat V
- Manufacturer: Ford Aerospace
- Launch mass: 1928 kg
- Dry mass: 1012 kg
- Dimensions: 1.66 x 2.1 x 1.77 metres

Start of mission
- Launch date: 6 December 1980, 23:31:00 UTC
- Rocket: Atlas SLV-3D Centaur-D1AR (AC-54)
- Launch site: CCAFS, LC-36B
- Contractor: General Dynamics
- Entered service: 1800 watts

End of mission
- Disposal: Graveyard orbit
- Deactivated: 14 April 1998

Orbital parameters
- Reference system: Geocentric orbit
- Regime: Geostationary orbit
- Longitude: 21.5° West (1980-1994); 40.5° West (1994-1998)
- Epoch: 6 December 1980

Transponders
- Band: 21 C-band; 4 Ku-band

Intelsat V F-2, then named Intelsat 502, was a communications satellite operated by COMSAT. Launched in 1980, it was the first of fifteen Intelsat V satellites to be launched. The Intelsat V series was constructed by Ford Aerospace, based on the Intelsat V satellite bus. Intelsat V F-2 was part of an advanced series of satellites designed to provide greater telecommunications capacity for INTELSAT's global network.

== Satellite ==
The satellite was box-shaped, measuring 1.66 by 2.1 by 1.77 metres; solar arrays spanned 15.9 metres tip to tip. The arrays, supplemented by nickel-hydrogen batteries during an eclipse, provided 1800 watts of power at mission onset of its seven-year design life. The payload housed 21 C-band and 4 Ku-band transponders. It could accommodate 15,000 two-way voice circuits and two TV channels simultaneously. It had a launch mass of 1928 kg. In December 1992, the satellite enabled a direct link between United States and the Somalia. The satellite was deactivated on 14 April 1998.

== Launch ==
The satellite was successfully launched into space on 6 December 1980, at 23:31:00 UTC, by means of an Atlas SLV-3D Centaur-D1AR vehicle from the Cape Canaveral Air Force Station, Florida, United States.
