= Fleet Satellite Communications System =

US space force communication system

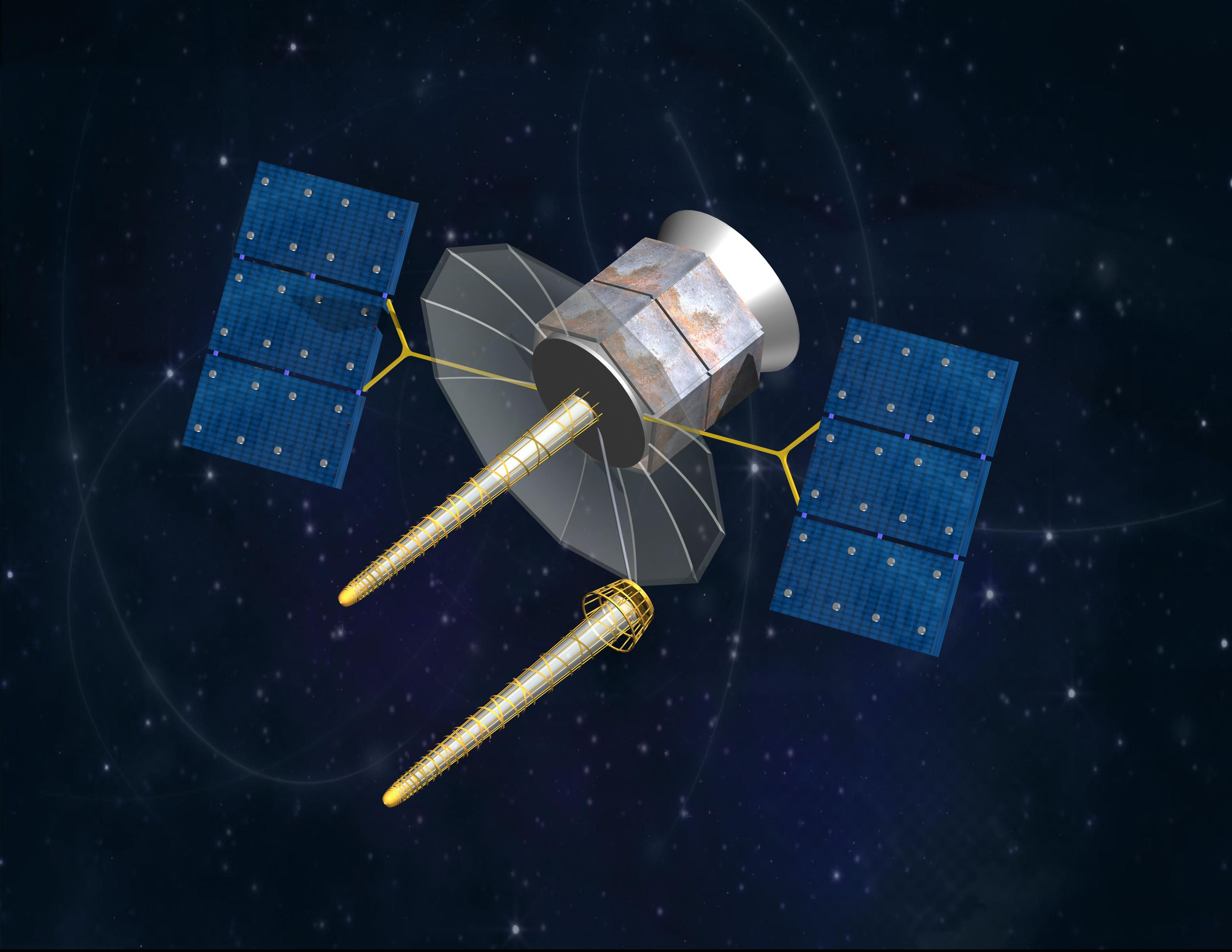
FLTSATCOM Satellite

FLTSATCOM (also FLTSAT) is a satellite communication system controlled by the U.S. Space Force (formally SPAWARSYSCOM) which was used for UHF radio communications between ships, submarines, airplanes and ground stations of the Navy.

Most of the transponders on these satellites were simple repeaters with no authentication or control over what they retransmitted.

== Satellite Characteristics ==
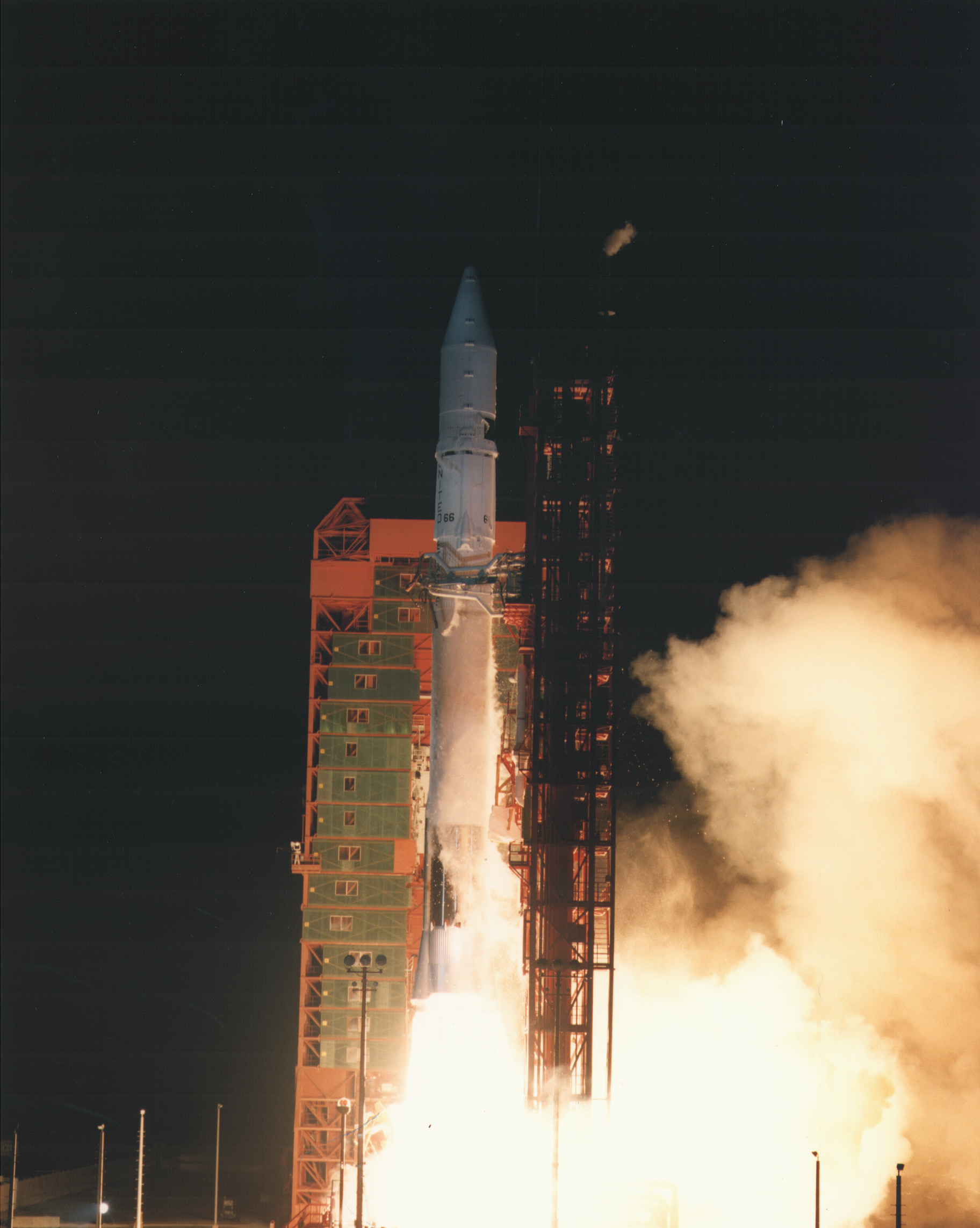
Launch of Atlas G AC-66 rocket with FLTSATCOM-7

Altogether eight satellites were launched from 1978 to 1989 by Atlas-Centaur rockets into geostationary orbit. The system became operational in 1981. The satellites were manufactured by TRW. The solar array of each satellite had a span of over 13.2 m. A special characteristic was a UHF transmit antenna reflector 4.9 m in diameter. Each satellite had 12 transponders, which worked in the UHF range from 240 - 400 megahertz. Additionally FLTSATCOM 7 and 8 included an experimental EHF transponder built by Lincoln Laboratory intended to test the MILSTAR ground terminals. The first seven satellites each had a launch mass of 1884 kg and the remaining two were 2310 kg, with the additional mass due to the EHF payload module.

In the late 1990s, FLTSATCOM satellites were gradually replaced by the UFO satellites.

FLTSATCOM 7 and FLTSATCOM 8 have been used for repeating UHF Satcom transmissions by unauthorized radio users particularly in Brazil, including criminals, illegal loggers, truckers and individuals located in remote areas. This has been met with limited law enforcement action.

As of September 2025, only one remains operational.

== Launches ==
Altogether eight satellites were launched from 1978 to 1989 by Atlas-Centaur rockets into geostationary orbit. The system became operational in 1981.

The fifth satellite reached geosynchronous orbit, but had severely limited utility due to damage to the solar arrays and antennas. The failure was attributed to explosive delamination of the fiberglass honeycomb fairing during flight. The inside wall of the fairing extensively damaged one of the solar arrays, and bent the transmit antenna mast which prevented the antenna from deploying fully.

Flight 7 was launched out of sequence after a launch failure of a Delta mission carrying the GOES-G weather satellite grounded the entire US launch fleet weeks prior to the scheduled launch of F-6. By the time the Delta mishap investigation concluded there was no risk to the Atlas-Centaur system, F-7 was ready to launch and the system managers elected to swap missions to avoid delaying EHF system testing.

Flight 6 was destroyed in a launch failure. The Atlas-Centaur was launched on March 26, 1987 into a heavy overcast with light rain. 51 seconds into the flight, the Atlas was struck by lightning and the resulting EMP changed a value in the guidance computer's core memory, causing the rocket to yaw and break apart from aerodynamic stress. As a result of this mishap, NASA and the Air Force re-emphasised and clarified the original weather guidelines developed after the Apollo 12 on-stand lightning strike for all future launches.

=== Launch Data ===
Satellite	Date/Time (UTC)	Rocket	S/N	Image	Note
FLTSATCOM 1	1978-02-09 21:17:01	Atlas-SLV3D	AC-44		Success
FLTSATCOM 2	4 May 1979 18:57:00	Atlas-SLV3D	AC-47		Success
FLTSATCOM 3	1980-01-18 01:26:00	Atlas-SLV3D	AC-49		Success
FLTSATCOM 4	1980-10-31 03:54:00	Atlas-SLV3D	AC-57		Success
FLTSATCOM 5	1981-08-06 08:16:00	Atlas-SLV3D	AC-59		Damaged upon launch
FLTSATCOM 7	1986-12-05 02:30:01	Atlas-G	AC-66		Success
FLTSATCOM 6	1987-03-26	Atlas-G	AC-67		Lightning strike destroyed the rocket
FLTSATCOM 8	1989-09-25 08:56:02	Atlas-G	AC-68		Success

== See also ==
- Electronics Technician
