= International Telecommunications Satellite Organization =

Intergovernmental organization

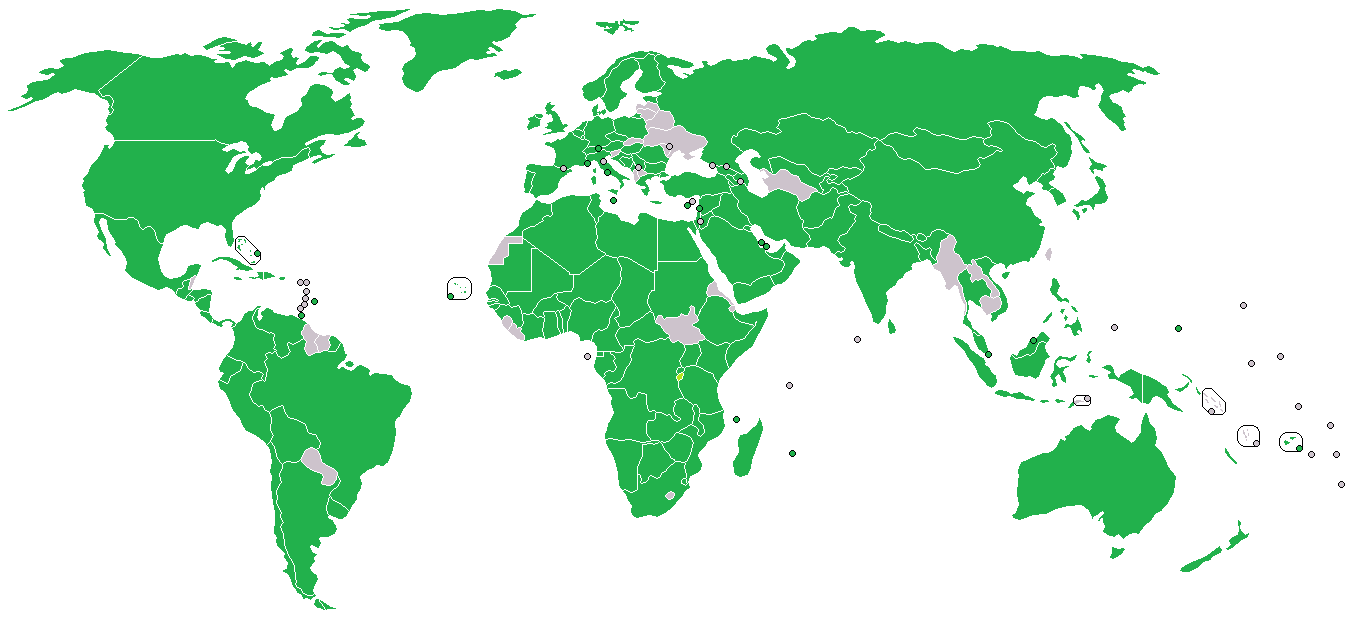
- Current members Signed, but not yet ratified
- Abbreviation: ITSO
- Formation: 1964
- Type: Intergovernmental organization
- Purpose: Access to high-quality and reliable public telecommunications services on global and non-discriminatory basis
- Headquarters: Washington D.C., U.S.
- Members: 149
- Key people: Renata Brazil-David (Director-General) & CEO)
- Website: www.itso.int

The International Telecommunications Satellite Organization (ITSO) is an intergovernmental organization charged with overseeing the public service obligations of Intelsat, which was privatized in 2001.

It incorporates the principle set forth in Resolution 1721 (XVI) of United Nations General Assembly, which expresses "All nations should have access to satellite communications".

The landmark headquarters of this organization was located in Washington D.C., United States.

As of June 2013, there are 149 states that are members of ITSO. States join ITSO by ratifying a multilateral treaty known as the Agreement relating to the International Telecommunications Satellite Organization. Bulgaria ratified the treaty in 1996 but denounced it and withdrew from the organization in 2012.

== Satellite fleet ==
Intelsat V fleet
Satellite	Manufacturer	Type	Launch Vehicle	Launch Date	Status	Notes
Intelsat V F-1						
Intelsat V F-2						
Intelsat V F-3						
Intelsat V F-4						
Intelsat V F-5						
Intelsat V F-6						
Intelsat V F-7	Ford Aerospace	Intelsat-V bus	Ariane 1 (L7)	19 October 1983	Deactivated in August 1996	
Intelsat V F-8						
Intelsat V F-9						
Intelsat V F-10						
Intelsat V F-11						
Intelsat V F-12						
Intelsat V F-13						
Intelsat V F-14						
Intelsat V F-15						

Intelsat VI fleet
Satellite	Manufacturer	Type	Launch Vehicle	Launch Date	Status	Notes
Intelsat 601	Hughes	HS-389	Ariane 44L (V47)	29 October 1991	Deactivated in October 2011	
Intelsat 602	Hughes	HS-389	Ariane 44L (V34)	27 October 1989		
Intelsat 603						
Intelsat 604						
Intelsat 605	Hughes	HS-389	Ariane 44L (V45)	14 August 1991	Deactivated in January 2009	

Intelsat VII fleet
Satellite	Manufacturer	Type	Launch Vehicle	Launch Date	Status	Notes
Intelsat 701	Space Systems/Loral	SSL-1300	Ariane 44LP H10 (V60)	22 October 1993	Decommissioned	
Intelsat 702	Space Systems/Loral	SSL-1300	Ariane 44LP H10+ (V64)	17 June 1994		
Intelsat 703	Space Systems/Loral	SSL-1300				
Intelsat 704	Space Systems/Loral	SSL-1300				
Intelsat 705	Space Systems/Loral	SSL-1300				
Intelsat 706	Space Systems/Loral	SSL-1300	Ariane 44 LP H10-3 (V73)	17 May 1995	Decommissioned in November 2014	
Intelsat 707	Space Systems/Loral	SSL-1300	Ariane 44 LP H10-3 (V84)	14 March 1996	Decommissioned in January 2011	
Intelsat 708	Space Systems/Loral	SSL-1300				
Intelsat 709	Space Systems/Loral	SSL-1300	Ariane 44 P H10-3 (V87)	14 June 1996	Decommissioned in February 2013	
Intelsat 801	Lockheed Martin	AS-7000	Ariane-44P H10-3 (V94)	1 March 1997	Decommissioned in October 2013	
Intelsat 802	Lockheed Martin	AS-7000	Ariane-44P H10-3 (V96)	25 June 1997	Deactivated in October 2010	
Intelsat 803	Lockheed Martin	AS-7000	Ariane-42L H10-3 (V100)	23 September 1997		
Intelsat 804	Lockheed Martin	AS-7000	Ariane-42L H10-3 (V104)	22 December 1997	Deactivated 14 January 2005	
Intelsat 805	Lockheed Martin	AS-7000				
Intelsat 806	Lockheed Martin	AS-7000				
Intelsat 901	Space Systems/Loral	SSL 1300	Ariane 44L H10-3 (V141)	9 June 2001		
Intelsat 902	Space Systems/Loral	SSL 1300	Ariane 44L H10-3 (V143)	30 August 2001		
Intelsat 903	Space Systems/Loral	SSL 1300				
Intelsat 904	Space Systems/Loral	SSL 1300	Ariane 44L H10-3 (V148)	23 February 2002		
Intelsat 905	Space Systems/Loral	SSL 1300	Ariane 44L H10-3 (V152)	5 June 2002		
Intelsat 906	Space Systems/Loral	SSL 1300	Ariane 44L H10-3 (V154)	6 September 2002		
Intelsat 907	Space Systems/Loral	SSL 1300	Ariane 44L H10-3 (V159)	15 February 2003	Last Ariane 4	
Intelsat 10-02	EADS Astrium	Eurostar-3000				
