= LR89 =

Liquid-fuel rocket engine (Atlas booster)

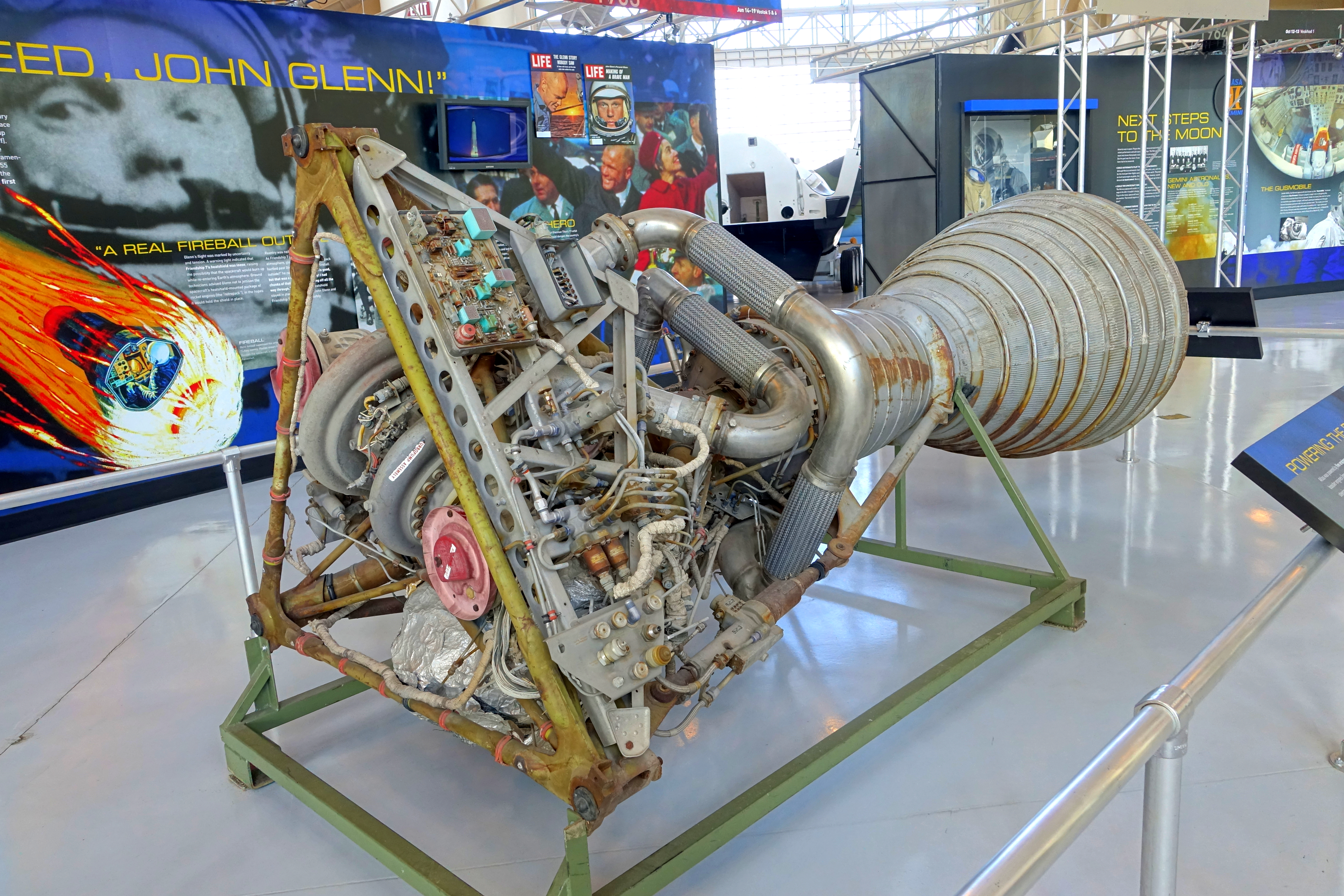
Rocketdyne LR89 at the Evergreen Aviation & Space Museum

The Rocketdyne LR89 was a liquid-fueled rocket engine developed in the 1950s by Rocketdyne, a division of North American Aviation. It was designed to serve as a booster engine the Atlas rocket family. The LR89 was a liquid oxygen (LOX) and RP-1 (kerosene) engine.

It was used in configurations where it worked alongside the LR105 sustainer engine to enhance thrust in the first stage of the Atlas, being jettisoned when the vehicle weight had been considerably reduced due to propellant consumption. It was used until the Atlas II, where the stage it was used on was replaced with the MA-5A, using two RS-56-OBA engines.

== Description ==
The LR89 was part of a family of engines that Rocketdyne developed to power the first American ICBMs and satellite launch vehicles. It was a gas-generator cycle engine, in which a portion of the fuel and oxidizer is burned to drive a turbine, which powers the fuel pumps, and featured a hypergolic igniter.

== Versions ==
The LR89 engine underwent several upgrades throughout its operational life, resulting in multiple versions:

Version	Year	Thrust (kN)	Thrust (lbf)	Specific impulse (s)	Burn Time (s)	Stage
XLR89-1	1956	758.70	170,562.54	282	133	MA-1
XLR89-5	1958	758.70	170,562.54	282	135	MA-2
LR89-5	1960	822.50	184,905.35	290	120	MA-3
LR89-7	1963	948.00	213,118.87	294	259	MA-5

== Atlas stage ==
The LR89 powered the first Atlas stage, in different configurations:

- MA-1 (booster only): two XLR89-1 booster engines and two LR101 vernier engines. Used on Atlas A;
- MA-1: two XLR89-1 booster engines, an LR105-3 sustainer, and two LR101 vernier engines. Used on Atlas B and Atlas C missiles;
- MA-2: two XLR89-5 booster engines, an LR105-5 sustainer, and two LR101 vernier engines. Used on Atlas D and Atlas LV-3B;
- MA-3: two LR89-5 booster engines, an LR105-5 sustainer, and two LR101 vernier engines. Used on Atlas E, Atlas F and Atlas E/F;
- MA-5: two LR89-7 booster engines, an LR105-5 sustainer, and two LR101 vernier engines. Used on Atlas SLV3, Atlas H, Atlas LV3C, Atlas G and Atlas I.

== See also ==
- Rocketdyne LR105
- Rocketdyne LR101
- SM-65 Atlas
- Rocketdyne
- MA-2 rocket stage
- MA-5 rocket stage
- MA-5A rocket stage
