= Deadfacing =

Electrical safety practice

Deadfacing or dead-facing is the practice of removing power from an electrical circuit prior to mating or demating the interface of the circuit. Deadfacing is used to prevent short circuits, as well as arcing that could damage circuitry, present a shock hazard, or introduce molten metal into the area of the circuit, or that could potentially trigger an explosion.

== Applications in spaceflight ==
Deadfacing is frequently employed in spaceflight. For example, the Apollo Lunar Module used deadfacing between the connectors coupling the ascent and descent stages, allowing the descent stage to be safely decoupled prior to liftoff of the ascent stage from the lunar surface. As a result of the Apollo 1 fire, one of the many recommendations was to use deadfacing for the connection and disconnection of peripheral electrical devices, such as cameras.

The first known project-wide requirement for deadfacing was in 1970, as part of the Atlas-Centaur program administered by General Dynamics. Prior to that time, it had been specified only on a connector-by-connector basis.
