= MA-2 (rocket stage) =

Half stage of the Atlas launch vehicle series

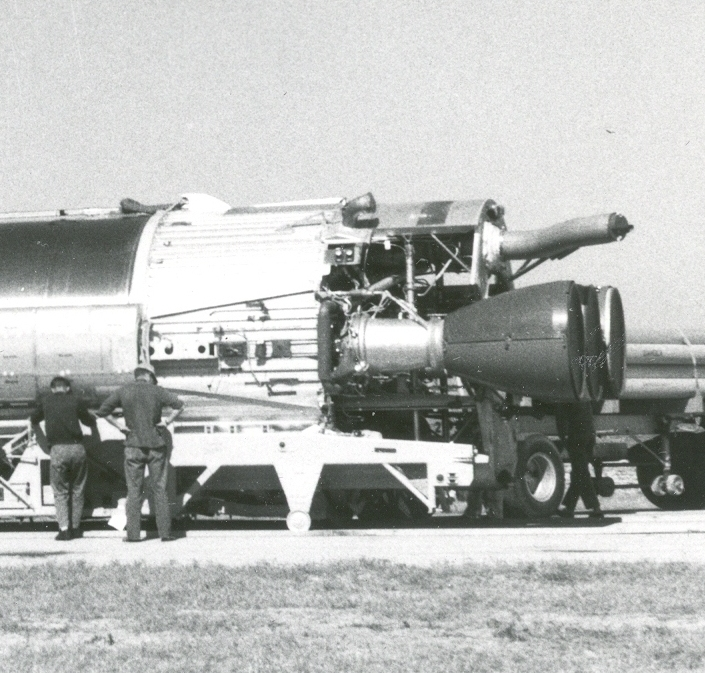
- Manufacturer: Lockheed Martin
- Country of origin: United States
- Used on: Atlas-D, Atlas-Agena and Atlas LV-3B

General characteristics
- Height: 3.43 metres (11.3 ft)
- Diameter: 4.9 metres (16 ft)
- Gross mass: 3,050 kilograms (6,720 lb)

Associated stages
- Derived from: MA-1
- Derivatives: MA-3

Launch history
- Status: Retired

MA-2
- Powered by: 2 XLR89-5
- Maximum thrust: 1,517.42 kN (341,130 lbf)
- Specific impulse: 282 seconds (2.77 km/s)
- Propellant: LOX/RP-1

MA-2 was an American liquid fueled rocket stage, developed by Lockheed Martin for use on the Atlas-D, Atlas-Agena and Atlas LV-3B ).

== Design ==
MA-2 functioned as the "half stage" in the Atlas's "stage-and-a-half" design, meaning they functioned as a booster attached to a central sustainer core, but did not include their own fuel tanks. Instead, fuel was drained out of the tanks of the sustainer core, until partway through the launch the booster segment was jettisoned. Similar to the booster segment on previous Atlas rockets, MA-2 consisted of a thrust structure with attachment points and fuel lines for two XLR89-5 rocket engines, each contained in a nacelle for aerodynamic reasons. The middle was left empty to accommodate the LR-105-5 engine of the sustainer stage. The two booster engines shared a common gas generator located at one of the engines, but separate turbopumps.

== See also ==
- MA-5 rocket stage
