= LR105 =

Liquid-fuel rocket engine (Atlas sustainer)

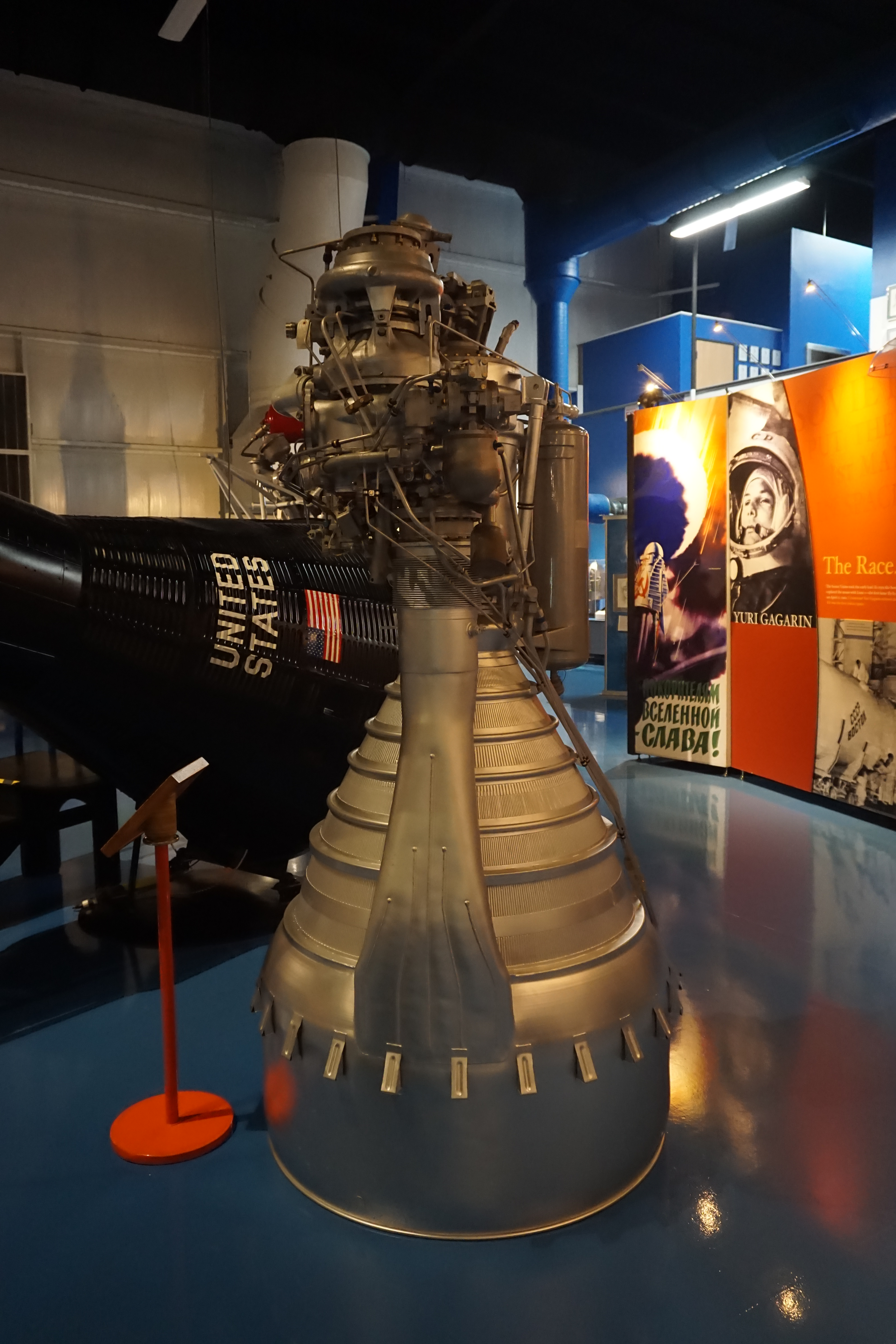
An LR105 Atlas sustainer engine on display at the Air Zoo.

The LR105 is a liquid-fuel rocket engine that served as the sustainer engine for the Atlas rocket family. Developed by Rocketdyne in 1957 as the S-4, it is called a sustainer engine because it continues firing after the LR89 booster engines have been jettisoned, providing thrust during the ascent phase.

== Description ==
The LR105 is a liquid-propellant engine using RP-1/LOX. The engine operates on a gas-generator cycle, where a small portion of the propellant is burned in a gas generator to drive the turbopumps, which supply the engine with fuel and oxidizer.

The engine was designed to be throttleable, meaning its thrust could be adjusted during flight to optimize performance. The LR105 also features regenerative cooling, where RP-1 fuel is circulated through cooling channels in the engine's nozzle and combustion chamber before being injected into the combustion process, preventing overheating and improving efficiency.

== Versions ==
The LR105 engine underwent several upgrades over its operational life, leading to multiple variants:

Version	Year	Thrust (kN)	Thrust (lbf)	Specific impulse (s)	Burn Time (s)	Details
LR105-3	1957	375.00	84,303.35	308		Atlas A, Atlas B
XLR105-5	1958	363.20	81,650.60	309	335	Atlas-Able, Atlas B, Atlas-Centaur, Atlas D, Atlas-Agena, Atlas LV-3B
LR105-5	1958	386.40	86,866.17	316	430	Atlas-Centaur, Atlas E, Atlas-Agena, Atlas F, Atlas SLV-3
LR105-7	1963	386.40	86,866.17	316	266	Atlas Agena, Atlas F, Atlas H, Atlas G, Atlas I

== See also ==
- Rocketdyne LR89
- Rocketdyne LR101
- SM-65 Atlas
- Rocketdyne
