= Intelsat V F-6 =

Geostationary communications satellite

Intelsat V F-6 → Intelsat 506
- Mission type: Communication
- Operator: COMSAT / INTELSAT
- COSPAR ID: 1983-047A
- SATCAT no.: 14077
- Mission duration: 7 years (planned)

Spacecraft properties
- Bus: Intelsat V
- Manufacturer: Ford Aerospace
- Launch mass: 1928 kg
- Dry mass: 1012 kg
- Dimensions: 1.66 x 2.1 x 1.77 metres
- Power: 1800 watts

Start of mission
- Launch date: 19 May 1983, 22:26:00 UTC
- Rocket: Atlas SLV-3D Centaur-D1AR (AC-61)
- Launch site: CCAFS, LC-36A
- Contractor: General Dynamics

End of mission
- Disposal: Graveyard orbit
- Deactivated: July 1998

Orbital parameters
- Reference system: Geocentric orbit
- Regime: Geostationary orbit
- Longitude: 18,5° West (1983-1992); 50.0° West (1992-1995); 31.4° West (1995-1998); 29.5° West (1998-1998)
- Epoch: 19 May 1983

Transponders
- Band: 21 C-band; 4 Ku-band

Intelsat V F-6, then named Intelsat 506, was a communications satellite operated by COMSAT. Launched in 1983, it was the sixth of fifteen Intelsat V satellites to be launched. The Intelsat V series was constructed by Ford Aerospace, based on the Intelsat V satellite bus. Intelsat V F-6 was part of an advanced series of satellites designed to provide greater telecommunications capacity for INTELSAT's global network.

== Satellite ==
The Intelsat V F-6 satellite was box-shaped, measuring 1.66 by 2.1 by 1.77 metres; solar arrays spanned 15.9 metres tip to tip. The arrays, supplemented by nickel-hydrogen batteries during eclipse, provided 1800 watts of power. The payload housed 21 C-band and 4 Ku-band transponders. It could accommodate 15,000 two-way voice circuits and two TV channels simultaneously. It had a launch mass of 1928 kg. He also carried a Maritime Communications Services (MCS) package for INMARSAT. The satellite was deactivated in July 1998.

== Launch ==
The satellite was successfully launched into space on 19 May 1982 at 22:26:00 UTC, by means of an Atlas SLV-3D Centaur-D1AR vehicle from the Cape Canaveral Air Force Station, Florida, United States. It had a launch mass of 1928 kg.

== See also ==
- 1983 in spaceflight
