= Atlas G =

Expendable launch vehicle

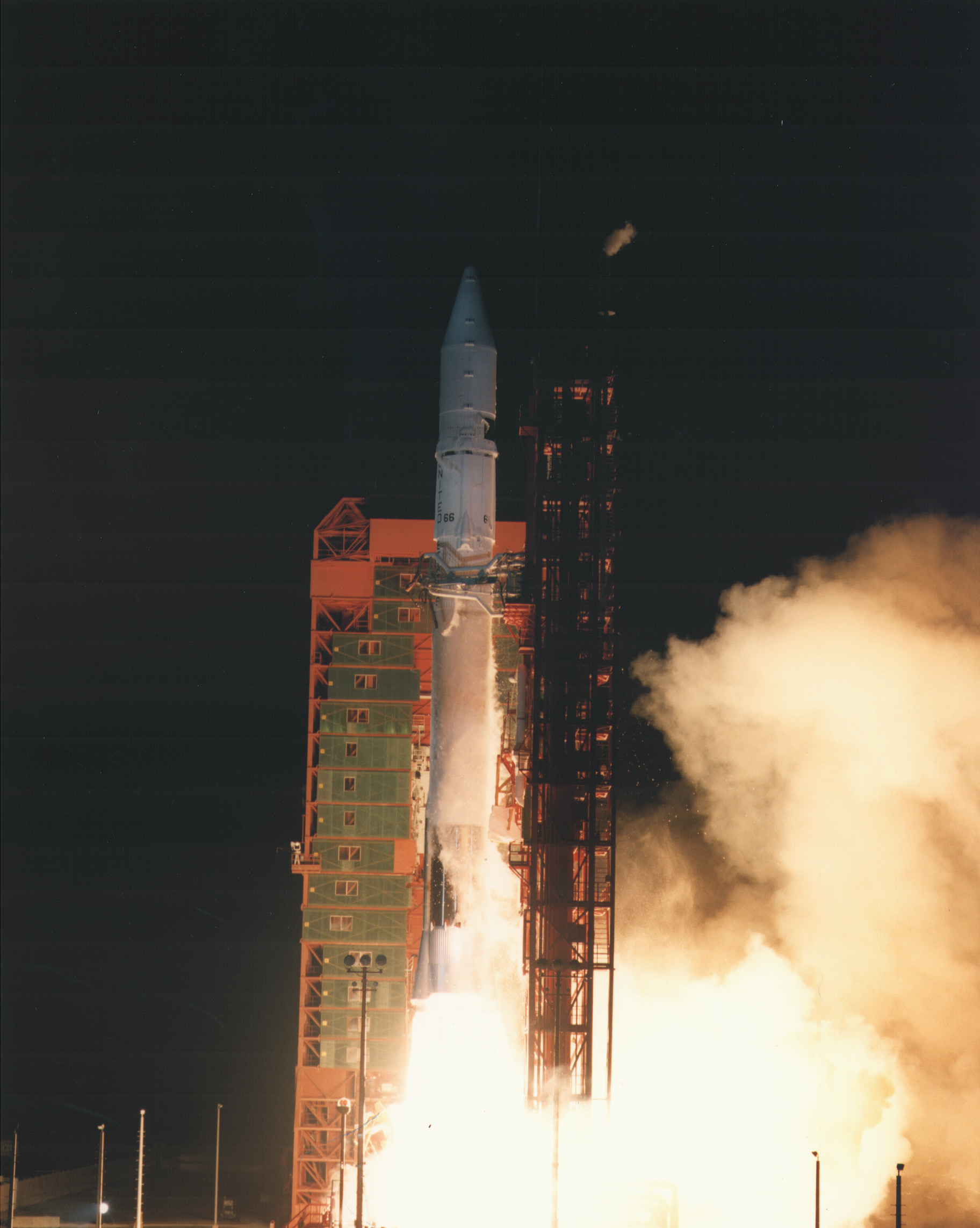
- Launch of FLTSATCOM-7 on an Atlas G (AC-66).
- Function: Expendable launch system
- Manufacturer: Convair/General Dynamics
- Country of origin: United States

Size
- Height: 43.90m (144.00 ft)
- Diameter: 3.05m (10 ft)
- Mass: 164,300kg (362,200 lb)
- Stages: 2.5

Capacity

Payload to 185 km (115 mi) LEO
- Mass: 5,900 kg (13,000 lb)

Payload to GTO
- Mass: 2,375 kg (5,236 lb)

Associated rockets
- Family: Atlas

Launch history
- Status: Retired
- Launch sites: LC-36B, Cape Canaveral
- Total launches: 7
- Success(es): 5
- Failure: 2
- First flight: 9 June 1984
- Last flight: 25 September 1989

Boosters – MA-5
- No. boosters: 1
- Powered by: 2 LR-89-7
- Maximum thrust: 1,901.6 kN (427,500 lb_{f})
- Specific impulse: 293.4 s (2.877 km/s)
- Burn time: 155 seconds
- Propellant: RP-1 / LOX

First stage
- Powered by: 1 LR-105-7
- Maximum thrust: 386.4 kN (86,900 lb_{f})
- Specific impulse: 316 s (3.10 km/s)
- Burn time: 266 seconds
- Propellant: RP-1 / LOX

Second stage – Centaur
- Powered by: 2 RL10A
- Maximum thrust: 147 kN (33,000 lb_{f})
- Specific impulse: 449 s (4.40 km/s)
- Burn time: 410 seconds
- Propellant: LH_{2} / LOX

The Atlas G, also known as Atlas G Centaur-D1AR was an American expendable launch system derived from the Atlas-Centaur. It was a member of the Atlas family of rockets and was used to launch seven communication satellites during the mid to late 1980s. Atlas G consisted of an improved Atlas core with modernized avionics and stretched propellant tanks. The Centaur stage also had several updated components and other technical improvements. Atlas G flew 7 times, with all missions aiming to go to a geostationary transfer orbit. It was replaced by the near-identical Atlas I, which had an improved guidance system and offered a larger payload fairing.

== Description ==
=== Atlas first stage ===
Atlas G was an evolution of the Atlas-Centaur, boasting numerous performance improvements. Compared to its predecessor, Atlas G featured an 81-inch stretch of its first-stage propellant tanks and a new MA-5 engine section on its first stage, increasing its thrust by 7,500 lbf (33,000 N).

The first stage MA-5 engine section consisted of 2 LR-89-7 booster engines and one LR-105-7 sustainer engine. 2 LR-101 vernier engines were mounted on the side of the vehicle for roll control. The structure of the first stage consisted of stainless steel balloon tanks, much like earlier Atlas rockets. The tanks featured extremely thin walls, saving a considerable amount of mass, but also requiring the stage to be constantly pressurized to not collapse. The sustainer and vernier engines were mounted onto this tank structure. The two booster engines, however, were mounted to their own cylindrical skirt structure which was attached to the bottom of the tanks. Each LR-89-7 had its own turbopump to feed propellants into the combustion chamber, but the two engines shared a single common gas generator.

The booster engines, along with their support structure and plumbing, would drop away around two and a half minutes into flight after the vehicle reached 5.3g of acceleration. As the sustainer engine was more efficient than the booster engines, dropping the booster engines increased the stage's performance. The LR-105-7 sustainer engine and LR-101 vernier engines shut down when all propellant in the first stage tanks was depleted, around four and a half minutes after liftoff. Toward the end of the first stage burn, the payload fairing was jettisoned.

=== Centaur upper stage ===
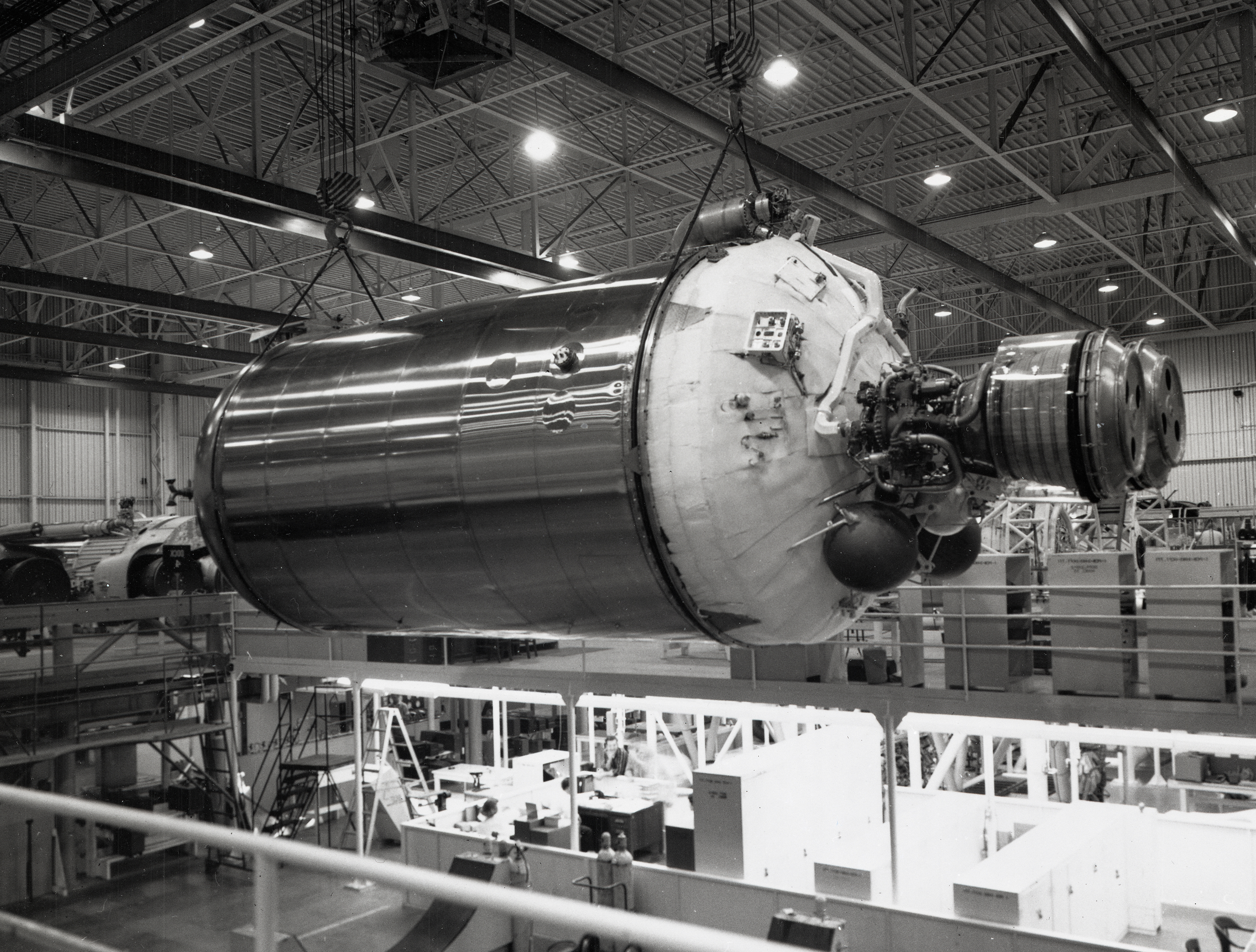
An early Centaur stage during assembly at General Dynamics in 1962

Atlas G's Centaur upper stage, known as Centaur D-1AR, featured several improvements over earlier Centaur variants. The hydrogen peroxide reaction control system (RCS) was replaced with a hydrazine RCS, a change that would persist up until the Centaur III flying on Atlas V. These controlled stage attitude during coasts between engine burns, as well as providing ullage thrust to settle propellants in the tanks. In addition, the hydrogen peroxide boost pumps on the RL10 engines were removed, giving the improved engines the designation "RL10A-3-3A". These engines also featured improved silver throat inserts.

To help slow the boiloff of liquid hydrogen in the tanks, Centaur featured fiberglass insulation panels that were jettisoned 25 seconds after the first-stage booster engines were jettisoned. The panels altogether had a mass of 553kg. This version of Centaur was one of the final variants to feature separating insulation panels.

== Launches ==
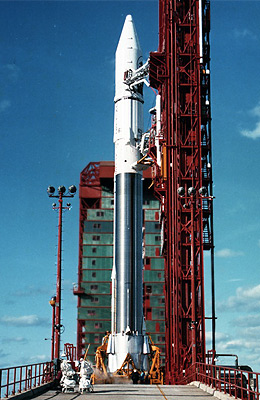
Atlas-G (AC-63) with Intelsat V-510

The maiden voyage of Atlas G was the launch of Intelsat 5 on June 9, 1984. Atlas performance was normal as was Centaur orbital injection, but during the coasting phase prior to the second Centaur burn, the stage's LOX tank split open. Centaur and Intelsat tumbled end-over-end and were left in a useless orbit where they remained until reentering the atmosphere four months later.

Investigation into the failure found that a minor fatigue crack developed in the Centaur LOX tank during staging and orbital injection, which eventually led to complete tank failure and loss of the mission. The uprated Centaur flown on Atlas G, among other changes, deleted the propellant boost pumps in the interest of greater simplicity and weight-saving. To compensate for this, LOX tank pressure was increased by 25%. Although the tank had been designed to accommodate higher pressure, technicians at Convair inexplicably failed to test Centaur 5402 for leaks before shipping it to Cape Canaveral. In addition, engineers had not tested the Centaur G stages to verify if they could handle the shock from the explosive bolts on the booster firing during staging, but this test was performed later and the stage passed it.

Finally, the leak testing program and tools used at Convair were outdated and less reliable than newer methods and the tech personnel in charge of fabricating the Centaur's balloon tanks were badly inexperienced. Ultimately, this was a symptom of the entire US space program in the 1980s as plans to entirely replace expendable launch vehicles with the Space Shuttle had resulted in large-scale budget cutbacks and layoffs of experienced technicians.

All seven launches of Atlas G flew from Launch Complex 36B at Cape Canaveral.

Atlas G launches
Designation	Launch Date and Time	Mission	Outcome
AC-62	Sat Jun 09, 1984 23:03 UTC	Intelsat V F-9	Failure
AC-63	Fri Mar 22, 1985 23:55 UTC	Intelsat VA F-10	Success
AC-64	Sun Jun 30, 1985 00:44 UTC	Intelsat VA F-11	Success
AC-65	Sat Sep 28, 1985 23:17 UTC	Intelsat VA F-12	Success
AC-66	Fri Dec 05, 1986 02:30 UTC	FLTSATCOM-7	Success
AC-67	Thu Mar 26, 1987 21:22 UTC	FLTSATCOM-6	Failure
AC-68	Mon Sep 25, 1989 08:56 UTC	FLTSATCOM-8	Success

The first stage was derived from the SM-65 Atlas missile, and a Centaur was used as the second stage. The first stage was also flown without the Centaur, as the Atlas H.
