= SCORE (satellite) =

First ever communications satellite

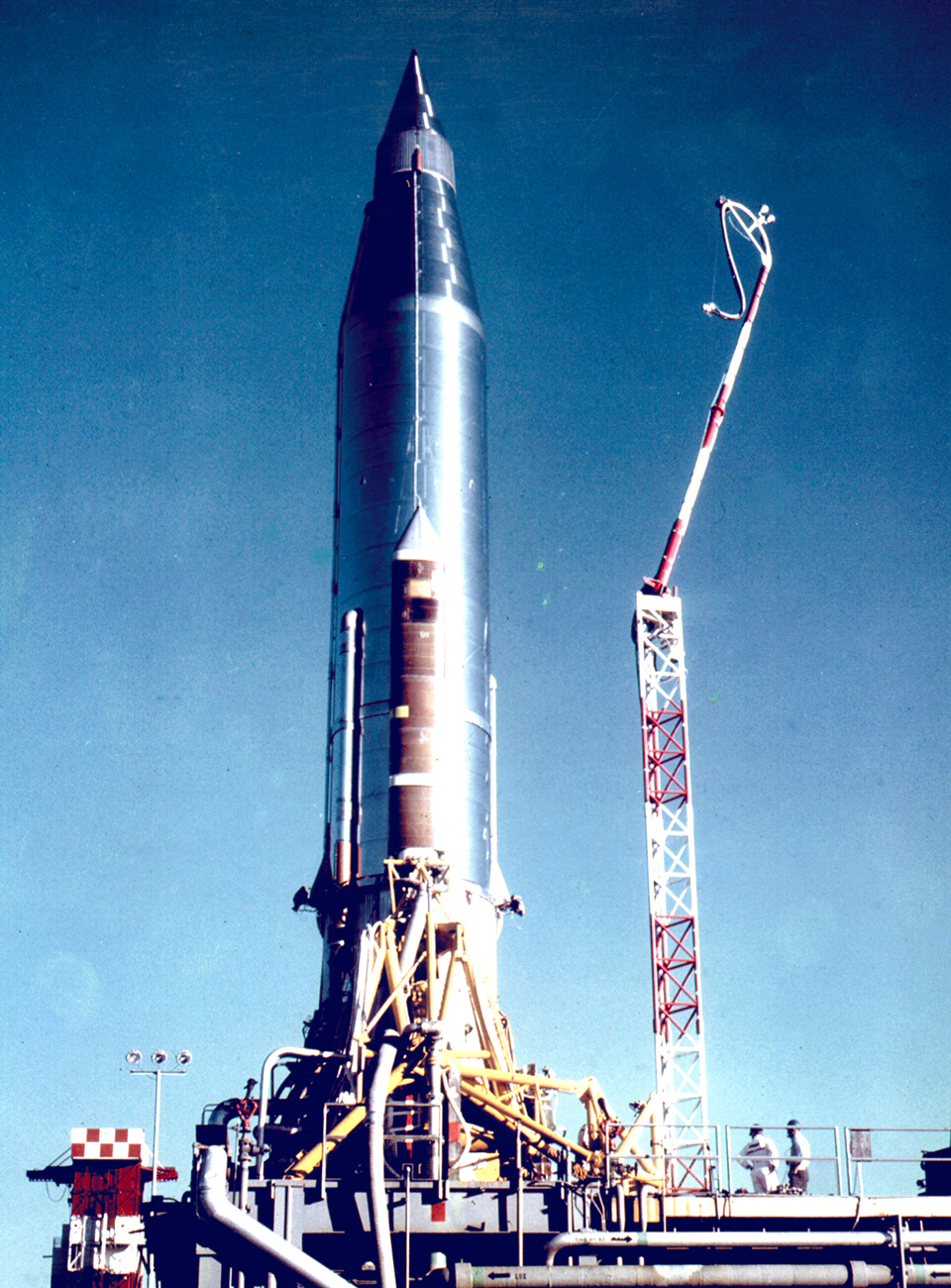
- The Atlas-B with SCORE on the launch pad; the rocket (without booster engines) constituted the satellite.
- Mission type: Communications
- Operator: U.S. Army / ARPA
- Harvard designation: 1958 Zeta 1
- COSPAR ID: 1958-006A
- SATCAT no.: 00010
- Mission duration: 12 days

Spacecraft properties
- Manufacturer: U.S. Army / ARPA
- Launch mass: 3980 kg
- Power: Batteries

Start of mission
- Launch date: 18 December 1958; 23:02:00 GMT
- Rocket: Atlas-B 10B
- Launch site: Cape Canaveral, LC-11

End of mission
- Last contact: 30 December 1958
- Decay date: 21 January 1959

Orbital parameters
- Reference system: Geocentric
- Regime: Low Earth
- Perigee altitude: 185 km
- Apogee altitude: 1484 km
- Inclination: 32.3°
- Period: 101.4 minutes
- Epoch: 18 December 1958

Instruments
- Signal Communication by Orbiting Relay Equipment

The message recorded of Eisenhower.

SCORE (Signal Communications by Orbiting Relay Equipment) was the world's first purpose-built communications satellite. Launched on December 18,1958, SCORE provided the first broadcast of a human voice from space. It was also the first successful usage of the Atlas rocket as a launch vehicle, The satellite was popularly dubbed "The Talking Atlas" as well as "Chatterbox".

== Background ==
Project SCORE was to be the first orbital project to utilize the Atlas. SCORE, a six-month effort, was the first endeavor of the then-new Advanced Research Projects Agency (ARPA)

The program set out to demonstrate the feasibility of transmitting messages through the upper atmosphere from one ground station to one or more ground stations.

In 1955, the Air Force had actually proposed using their Atlas Intercontinental Ballistic Missile as an International Geophysical Year satellite launcher in 1957–58. This proposal was rejected because it would redirect resources from the ICBM's development, it was also feared that the rocket would not be ready in time for the IGY. As it turned out, SCORE was launched within the IGY after all.

== Spacecraft ==
The SCORE (Signal Communication by Orbiting RElay) satellite of the US Army was a 24.3 metres (80 ft) long, and 3.1 metres (10 ft) diameter Atlas missile used as a platform for a communications relay experiment to demonstrate the feasibility and explore problems associated with operation of a satellite communication system. The spacecraft body served as antennae. It carried messages on a tape recorder which was used at one point to carry a Christmas greeting from President Eisenhower. The performance was nominal with experiment operation for 12 days, planned orbit lifetime 20 days, actual orbit lifetime 34 days. The tracking beacon operated at 108 MHz.

The payload weighed 68 kg, and was built into the fairing pods of the Atlas missile. Combined weight of the total on-orbit package was 3980 kg. SCORE was launched into a 185 km by 1484 km orbit from LC-11 at Cape Canaveral Missile Test Annex, Florida, inclined at 32.3°, with a period of 101.4 minutes. Its batteries lasted 12 days and it reentered the atmosphere on 21 January 1959.

The SCORE communications package was designed and built by Kenneth Masterman-Smith, a military communication research engineer, along with other personnel with the U.S. Army Signal Research and Development Laboratory (SRDL) at Fort Monmouth, New Jersey. The overall program was conducted in such secrecy that only 88 people were aware of its existence. Before the date of the SCORE launch, 53 of the 88 people had been told the program had been canceled and they were not to mention to anyone that it had ever existed. That left only 35 people who knew of the mission of Atlas 10B with the rest of the engineering crew, including the launch crew, under the impression that they were working solely on a test launch of the rocket. The night before launch, however, Rear Adm. John E. Clark, deputy director of ARPA, was asked at a news conference whether he could deny that Eisenhower's voice was on the recorder. He replied, "No", and news reports that day suggested the voice might well be the president's.

== Signal Communication by Orbiting Relay Equipment ==
This first purpose-built communications satellite experiment consisted of two identical communications repeater terminals mounted in the guidance pods along the sides of the launch vehicle. The experiment was to test the feasibility and explore problems associated with using satellites for communications purposes. No modulation was received on the carrier wave from experiment package no. 1. Voice and teletype messages were sent and returned in real-time, and also from experiment tape recorder no. 2. The tape recorder was loaded with new material 28 times and failure finally was due to battery depletion. The experiment receiver and transmitter operated on 150 and 132 MHz, respectively. The payload weighed 68 kilograms (150 lb), and was built into the fairing pods of the Atlas missile. Combined weight of the total on-orbit package was 3,980 kilograms (8,770 lb).

== Mission ==
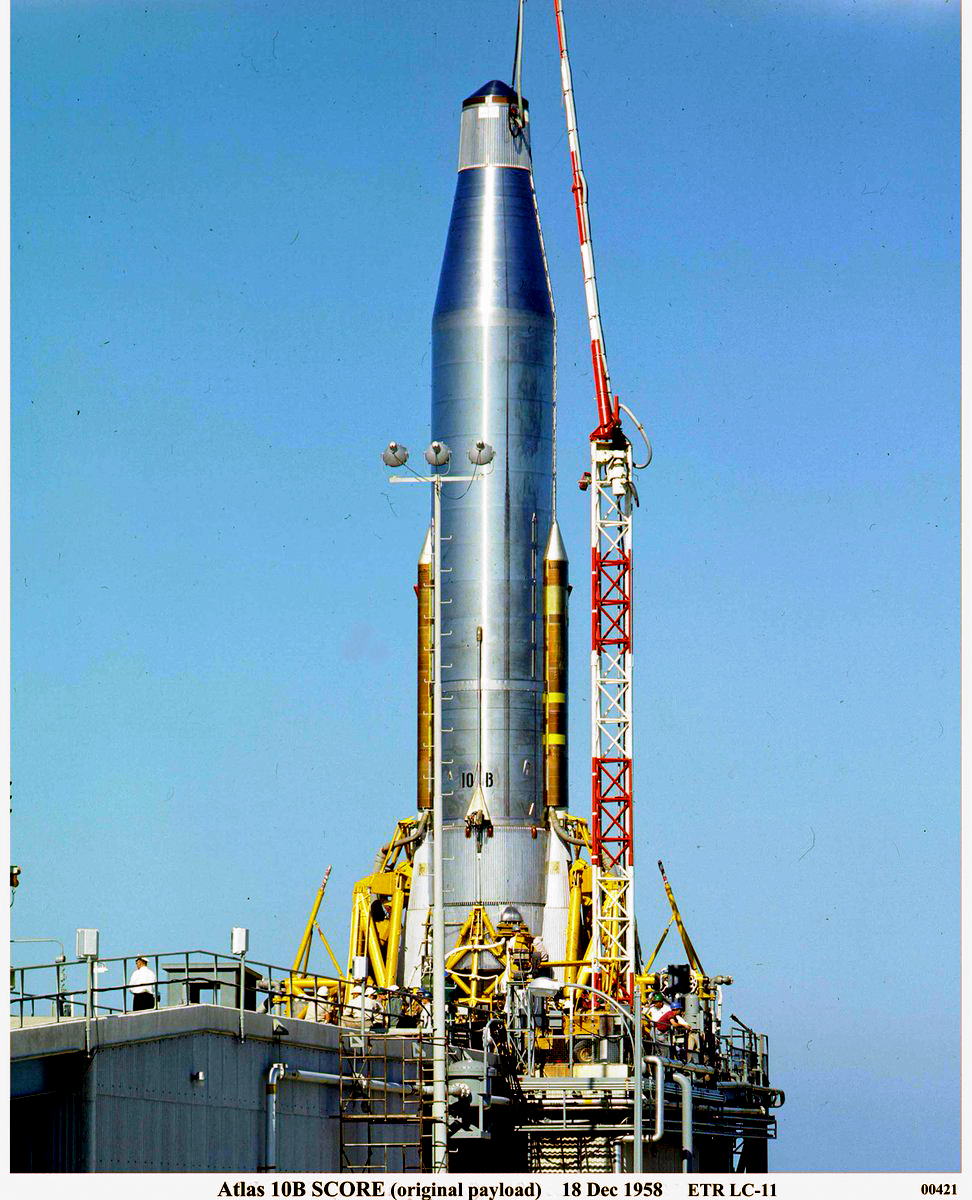
Atlas 10B SCORE at LC-11

Just as Sputnik 1 was launched by the first Soviet ICBM (the R-7 Semyorka) shortly after the missile had made its first operational flight, the SCORE mission occurred just three weeks after the first successful Atlas test launch on 28 November 1958. SCORE was launched on 18 December 1958 into an orbit with a perigee of 185 kilometres (115 mi), an apogee of 1,484 kilometres (922 mi) from LC-11 at Cape Canaveral Missile Test Annex, Florida, inclined at 32.3°, with a period of 101.4 minutes. Its batteries lasted 12 days and it reentered the atmosphere on 21 January 1959.

On December 18, 1958, President Eisenhower was hosting a diplomatic delegation from Soviet-controlled Poland at the White House. During the state dinner, he received confirmation of the successful orbital insertion. Eisenhower interrupted the proceedings to announce the project's existence to the attendees. While the public message focused on the peaceful nature of the communications relay, the launch served as a strategic demonstration that the United States possessed the capability to deliver a nuclear payload from orbit using the Atlas platform.

The communications repeater installed on the missile received, amplified and retransmitted signals. Two redundant sets of equipment were mounted in the nose of the SCORE missile. Four antennas were mounted flush with the missile surface, two for transmission and two for reception. SCORE's other equipment included two tape recorders, each with a four-minute capacity. Any of four ground stations in the southern United States could command the satellite into playback mode to transmit the stored message or into record mode to receive and store a new message. These redundancies proved invaluable as one of the tape recorders malfunctioned and was rendered inoperable during the 12-day mission.

According to an official history of the Advanced Research Projects Agency (ARPA), SCORE was originally programmed to broadcast a voice message from Army Secretary Wilber M. Brucker. When the President learned this fact, hours before lift-off, he said he would like to provide the message. His tape-recording was hand-carried to Cape Canaveral, but by then the payload was locked and ready for launch. The ARPA program director decided to launch with the Army message, then erase it while in space, and upload the President's message to replace it. This effort was successful, and accordingly SCORE's transmitted message from space to Earth was as follows:

This is the President of the United States speaking. Through the marvels of scientific advance, my voice is coming to you from a satellite circling in outer space. My message is a simple one: Through this unique means I convey to you and to all mankind, America's wish for peace on Earth and goodwill toward men everywhere.

The broadcast signal for Eisenhower's greeting was fairly weak, and only very sensitive radio receivers were able to detect it. Most Americans heard the message as it was rebroadcast on commercial news programs.

== See also ==
- List of communications satellite firsts
- Project Echo
