= MA-5A =

- Manufacturer: Lockheed Martin
- Country of origin: United States
- Used on: Atlas II

General characteristics
- Height: 3.43 metres (11.3 ft)
- Diameter: 3.05 metres (10.0 ft)
- Gross mass: 4,187 kilograms (9,231 lb)
- Derived from: MA-5

Launch history
- Status: Retired

MA-5A
- Powered by: 2 RS-56-OBA
- Maximum thrust: 2,100 kN (470,000 lbf)
- Specific impulse: 296 seconds (2.90 km/s)
- Propellant: LOX/RP-1

MA-5A was an American liquid fueled rocket stage. It was manufactured by Lockheed Martin for use on the Atlas II, IIA and IIAS rockets, derived from the MA-5 used on the Atlas I.

== Design ==
MA-5A functioned as the "half stage" in the Atlas's "stage-and-a-half" design, meaning they functioned as a booster attached to a central sustainer core, but did not include their own fuel tanks. Instead, fuel was drained out of the tanks of the sustainer core, until partway through the launch the booster segment was jettisoned. Similar to the booster segments on previous Atlas rockets, MA-5A consisted of a thrust structure with attachment points and fuel lines for two RS-56-OBA rocket engines, each contained in a nacelle for aerodynamic reasons. The middle was left empty to accommodate the RS-56-OSA engine of the sustainer stage. The two booster engines shared a common gas generator, but separate turbopumps, combustion chambers, and other hardware. The stage also contains ten bottles of pressurized helium, used to drive the pneumatics for the engines and for tank pressurization. On the Atlas IIAS configuration, MA-5A also featured attachment points for four Castor 4A solid rocket boosters.

MA-5A was based on the design of the previous MA-5 stage, used on Atlas I. The main difference between the two designs was the replacement of the MA-5's two LR-89-7 engines with RS-56-OSAs.

== See also ==
- MA-5 rocket stage
