= MA-5 (rocket stage) =

American liquid-fuel rocket stage

- Manufacturer: Lockheed Martin
- Country of origin: United States
- Used on: Atlas I

General characteristics
- Height: 3.43 metres (11.3 ft)
- Diameter: 4.9 metres (16 ft)
- Gross mass: 3,646 kilograms (8,038 lb)

Associated stages
- Derived from: MA-2
- Derivatives: MA-5A

Launch history
- Status: Retired

MA-5
- Powered by: 2 LR-89-7
- Maximum thrust: 1,896.01 kN (426,240 lbf)
- Specific impulse: 294 seconds (2.88 km/s)
- Propellant: LOX/RP-1

MA-5 was an American liquid fueled rocket stage, developed by Lockheed Martin for use on the Atlas I rocket.

== Design ==
MA-5 functioned as the "half stage" in the Atlas's "stage-and-a-half" design, meaning they functioned as a booster attached to a central sustainer core, but did not include their own fuel tanks. Instead, fuel was drained out of the tanks of the sustainer core, until partway through the launch the booster segment was jettisoned. Similar to the booster segments on previous Atlas rockets, MA-5 consisted of a thrust structure with attachment points and fuel lines for two LR-89-7 rocket engines, each contained in a nacelle for aerodynamic reasons. The middle was left empty to accommodate the LR-105-7 engine of the sustainer stage. The two booster engines shared a common gas generator, but separate turbopumps, combustion chambers, and other hardware.

== See also ==
- MA-5A rocket stage
