= Intelsat V F-9 =

Failed communications satellite

Intelsat V F-9 → Intelsat 509
- Mission type: Communication
- Operator: Intelsat
- COSPAR ID: 1984-057A
- SATCAT no.: 14077
- Mission duration: 7 years (planned); Launch failure

Spacecraft properties
- Bus: Intelsat-V bus
- Manufacturer: Ford Aerospace
- Launch mass: 1,928.2 kilograms (4,251 lb)
- BOL mass: 1,012 kilograms (2,231 lb)

Start of mission
- Launch date: June 9, 1984, 23:03 UTC
- Rocket: Atlas G
- Launch site: Cape Canaveral LC-36B

Orbital parameters
- Reference system: Geocentric
- Regime: Geostationary
- Epoch: Planned

Intelsat 509, previously named Intelsat V F-9, was a communications satellite operated by Intelsat. Launched in 1984, it was the ninth of fifteen Intelsat V satellites to be launched. The Intelsat V series was constructed by Ford Aerospace, based on the Intelsat-V satellite bus. Intelsat V F-9 was part of an advanced series of satellites designed to provide greater telecommunications capacity for Intelsat's global network. The satellite also carried a Maritime Communications Services (MCS) package for Inmarsat. However, the Centaur launch vehicle failed to put the satellite into a useful orbit.

The satellite launch took place on June 9, 1984, at 23:03 UTC, by means of an Atlas-Centaur G-D1AR vehicle from the Cape Canaveral Air Force Station, Florida, United States. It had a launch mass of 1,928 kg. The Intelsat 509 was equipped with 4 Ku-band transponders more 21 C-band transponders for 12,000 audio circuits and 2 TV channels.
