= Intelsat VA F-10 =

Geostationary communications satellite

Intelsat VA F-10 → Intelsat 510
- Mission type: Communication
- Operator: Intelsat
- COSPAR ID: 1985-025A
- SATCAT no.: 15629
- Mission duration: 9 years (planned)

Spacecraft properties
- Bus: Intelsat-VA
- Manufacturer: Ford Aerospace
- Launch mass: 2013 kg
- Dry mass: 1098 kg
- Power: 1800 watts

Start of mission
- Launch date: 22 March 1985, 23:55:00 UTC
- Rocket: Atlas G (AC-63)
- Launch site: CCAFS, LC-36B
- Contractor: General Dynamics

End of mission
- Disposal: Graveyard orbit
- Deactivated: July 1999

Orbital parameters
- Reference system: Geocentric orbit
- Regime: Geostationary orbit
- Epoch: 22 March 1985

Transponders
- Band: 26 C-Band; 6 Ku-band

Intelsat 510, previously named Intelsat VA F-10, was a communications satellite operated by Intelsat. Launched in 1985, it was the tenth of fifteen Intelsat V satellites to be launched. The Intelsat V series was constructed by Ford Aerospace, based on the Intelsat-VA satellite bus. Intelsat VA F-10 was part of an advanced series of satellites designed to provide greater telecommunications capacity for Intelsat's global network.

== Launch ==
The satellite was successfully launched into space on 22 March 1985, at 23:55:00 UTC, by means of an Atlas-Centaur G vehicle from the Cape Canaveral Air Force Station, Florida, United States. It had a launch mass of 2013 kg. The Intelsat 510 was equipped with 6 Ku-band transponders more 26 C-band transponders for 15,000 audio circuits and 2 TV channels.
