= SM-65B Atlas =

Prototype of the Atlas missile

Atlas B (SM-65B)
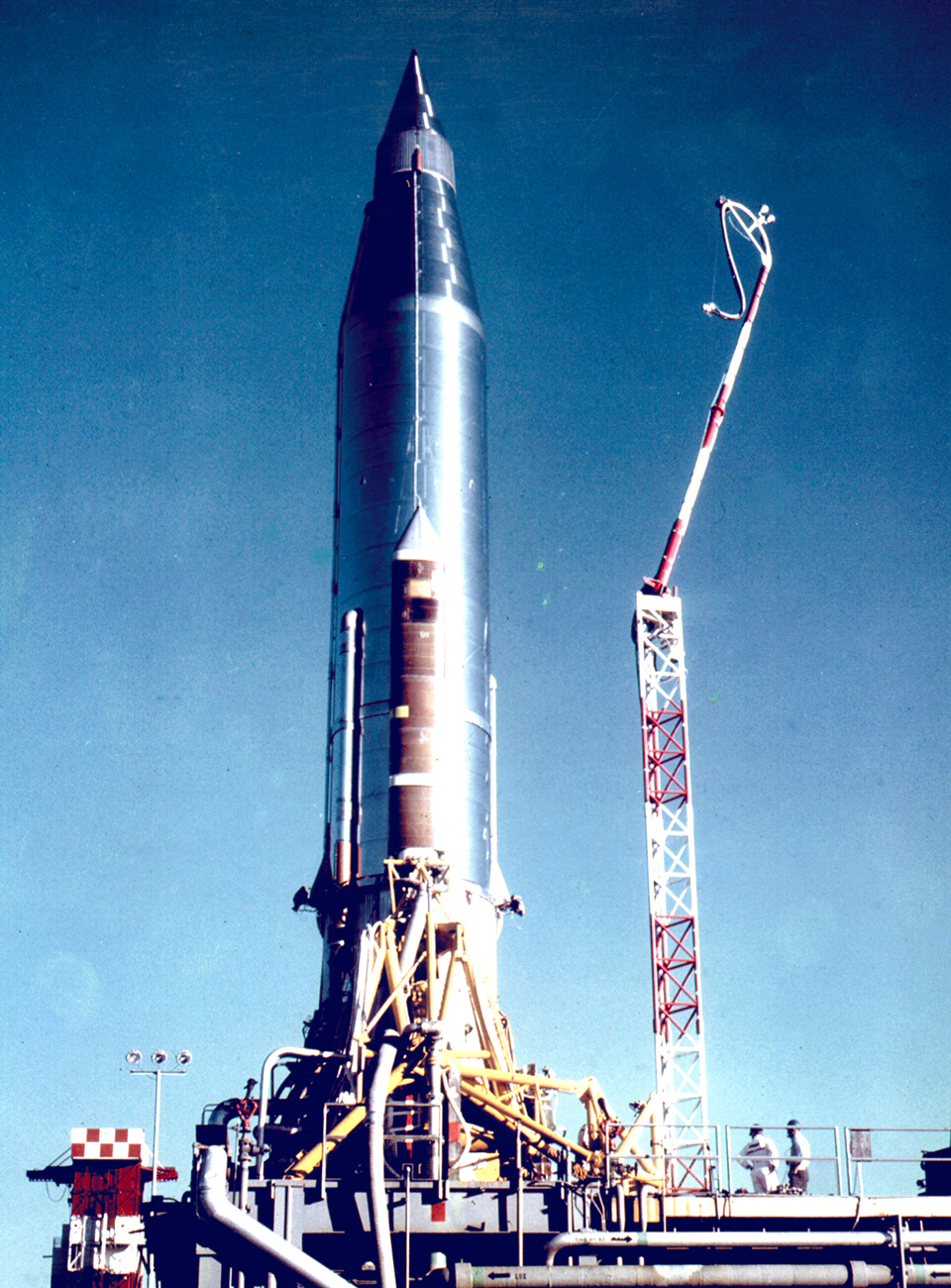
- Atlas B (10B) before the launch of SCORE (USAF)
- Function: Prototype ICBM; Expendable launch system
- Manufacturer: Convair/General Dynamics
- Country of origin: United States

Launch history
- Status: Retired
- Launch sites: LC-11, LC-13 & LC-14, CCAFS
- Total launches: 10
- Success(es): 6
- Failure: 4
- First flight: 19 July 1958
- Last flight: 4 February 1959

Boosters
- No. boosters: 1
- Powered by: 2 XLR-89-5
- Total thrust: 341,130 lbf (1,517.4 kN)
- Specific impulse: 282 s
- Burn time: 135 s
- Propellant: RP-1/LOX

First stage
- Powered by: 1 XLR-105-5
- Maximum thrust: 86,844 lbf (386.30 kN)
- Specific impulse: 309 s
- Burn time: 240 s
- Propellant: RP-1/LOX

The Convair SM-65B Atlas, or Atlas B, also designated X-12 was a prototype of the Atlas missile. First flown on 19 July 1958, the Atlas B was the first version of the Atlas rocket to use the stage and a half design with an operational sustainer engine and jettisonable booster engine section. Unlike later Atlas models, the Atlas B used explosive bolts to jettison the booster section.

Ten flights were made. Nine of these were sub-orbital test flights of the Atlas as an Intercontinental Ballistic Missile, with five successful missions and four failures. The seventh flight, launched on 18 December 1958, was used to place the SCORE satellite into low Earth orbit, the first orbital launch conducted by an Atlas rocket.

== Test history ==
The B series test program took a considerable amount of delays and frustration, not in the least because the Atlas B was far more complicated than the prototype Atlas A, in fact the first launch would feature all hardware systems found on an operational Atlas, including the sustainer engine, separable booster section, guidance computer, Azusa tracking system, detachable nose cone, and more. The first flight article missile, 3B, was originally planned for launch in May 1958, but the date was set back by endless hardware difficulties, both with the missile itself and the newly opened LC-11. In addition, Atlas 3B could not be cleared for flight until a successful firing run of Missile 2B was performed at the Sycamore Canyon test stand, which was also experiencing nonstop technical issues. The launch of a third Soviet satellite in April also put further pressure on program planners. Finally, on July 19, Missile 3B was launched. Engine start proceeded normally and the launcher release system functioned well. The Atlas performed well until T+19 seconds when the programmer attempted to initiate the pitch and roll maneuver. At this point, the missile began swerving from side to side uncontrollably and finally broke up at the forward end of the LOX tank at T+43 seconds, the lower portion from the fuel tank downward remaining intact until impact in the ocean. Even before the flight had terminated, real time telemetry readouts clearly indicated that the fault lay in the yaw gyro motor, which was not running. To prevent a recurrence of this, Convair developed the Spin Motor Rotation Detection system, a collection of sensors designed to ensure proper gyroscope operation and which would prevent the launch if the motors were not running at the proper speed. It was not fully phased into Atlas vehicles until 1961 however. Atlas 3B was considered "partially successful" because all other systems had functioned properly. The only other abnormality was an unusually high usage of helium pressure gas, possibly due to a leak. If the flight had not terminated prematurely, the helium supply might have become depleted. Tank pressures however remained within normal levels until missile destruction. A minor thrust section fire was evident from T+9 seconds, caused by placement of the lube oil vent line near the booster turbine exhaust, however this was believed to have no connection to the subsequent loss of the missile. One telemetry channel failed during the prelaunch countdown, as a consequence 13 telemetry measurements were inactive during the flight.

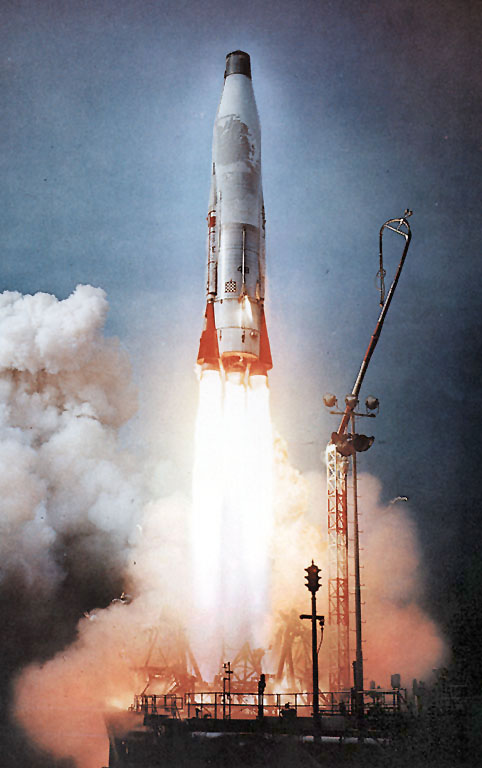
Atlas B ICBM (flight 4B), 2 August 1958

On Missile 4B, the location of the lube oil vent lines was moved, and improved heat insulation added to the firewall and engine boots. It was successfully launched on August 2 from LC-13 on a 2,500-mile (4,000 km) flight. All systems functioned well and booster section separation, which was tested for the first time, occurred on schedule. Two problems occurred on 4B. The first involved high vibration levels following BECO; this was corrected by a few modifications to the autopilot, as well as moving the rate gyros forward slightly to increase their responsiveness to missile bending. The other was a repeat of the high helium usage on 3B, due to a suspected fault in the LOX tank pressure regulator. At T+155 seconds, the LOX tank pressure surged to the point where it went out of instrumentation range. Total helium usage for booster phase was 14 pounds (6.4 kg) higher than normal, and 11 pounds (5.0 kg) higher than normal during sustainer phase.

Missile 5B was launched from LC-11 on August 29 and reached an apogee of 550 miles (890 km). On 5B, pneumatic system problems occurred once again when LOX tank pressure increased abruptly, and the pneumatic system failed to cut off the flow of helium to the tank, which continued past SECO. Helium usage for the booster phase of flight was 17 pounds (7.7 kg) above normal and 2.7 pounds (1.2 kg) above normal for booster phase. During vernier solo phase, insufficient hydraulic pressure to the verniers was maintained, resulting in an unstable flight path, however the RV impacted close to the target point. In addition, the guidance system rate beacon experienced difficulties early in the flight, however discreet steering commands were issued properly. One telemetry channel failed at T+164 seconds.

Missiles 6B, 12B, 10B, and 13B were built as special "hot rods", meaning they had lighter weight Atlas C equipment pods, no detachable RV, and reduced telemetry - the first two carried only one telemetry package instead of the standard three used on R&D Atlas missiles, and the latter two had none. These four vehicles were designed to demonstrate flying an Atlas missile to the maximum possible range.

Missile 8B on September 14 continued the streak of pneumatic system difficulties when the LOX tank pressure regulator went full open for five seconds starting at T+210 seconds, resulting in a surge in tank pressure. The problem in this case was suspected to be caused by above-normal helium bottle temperatures. In addition, vernier hydraulic pressure failed again during vernier solo phase causing loss of gimbaling control over the verniers, although nose cone impact was close to the target point.

Missile 6B broke the streak of successful flights on September 18 when it exploded 82 seconds after liftoff. The cause of the failure was traced to a seized turbopump, which resulted in abrupt termination of B-1 engine thrust at T+80 seconds. LOX regulator pressure fell off, resulting in gas generator flameout and complete shutdown of both booster engines. The missile pitched and broke up. It was suspected that flying debris from the turbopump ruptured the LOX regulator sense line. At liftoff, one of the launcher hold-down arms had also not retracted properly, which resulted in holes being torn in the B-1 thrust structure, however this was quickly ruled out as a cause of the failure.

The turbopump failure was a persistent problem that had plagued Thor, Jupiter, and Atlas launches, all of which used a variant of the same Rocketdyne engine and which had an extremely marginal turbopump design. Two separate problems affected the pump. One of these was the tendency of the lubricant oil to foam at high altitude as air pressure decreased, resulting in loss of lubricant and pump seizure. The other was the tendency of the bearings to come loose from the centrifugal force caused by the pump's nearly 10,000 rpm operating speed. The Army Ballistic Missile Division had replaced all of the turbopumps in their stock of Jupiter missiles and did not experience any turbopump failures after December 1957, but the Air Force resisted doing the same with Thor and Atlas missiles so as to not delay the test program. The result was that several pump-related failures occurred in the Thor and Atlas programs during 1958 and only after Atlas 6B did they finally give in and agree to replace the pumps. After the failure of Atlas 15A to a turbopump problem in April, the Air Force agreed to a fix for the oil foaming issue by changing the pressure in the gearbox and using a different viscosity of oil but rejected the idea of outright replacing the pumps with the newer model Rocketdyne had developed even though it would have only taken a month to replace the old pumps.

Missile 9B, the first Atlas with upgraded turbopumps, was launched on November 18. Roll control was extremely poor for the first 44 seconds of launch, resulting in excessive movements of the booster engines and verniers to maintain missile stability. Excessive fuel consumption led to premature sustainer shutdown and so the missile did not achieve its planned range of 3,150 miles (5,070 km), instead managing only 2,300 miles (3,700 km). BECO occurred at T+131 seconds and SECO at T+227 seconds, while nose cone separation was not accomplished. The malfunction was due to the turbopumps, which were also C-series models, not being properly matched to the engines in the Atlas. Due to the need to test them, there had not been any time to perform this step. The roll control problem resulted in yet more autopilot modifications.

On November 29, Missile 12B was successfully launched from LC-14 and made a 6,325-mile (10,179 km) lob, the first full-range flight of an Atlas missile. This step was achieved a full six months earlier than originally anticipated by program plans.

On the evening of December 18, Missile 10B performed the first use of an Atlas for a space launch when it orbited SCORE, a prototype communications satellite. This Atlas included several modifications for the flight, including 5-second vernier start tanks. The missile was also stripped down to save weight—the Azusa tracking system, telemetry packages, and all other hardware not absolutely essential to the flight were removed. In addition, it was equipped with MA-1 engines that had been tested and found to have above-average performance. The launch was conducted with stringent secrecy, in part because the Air Force were concerned about another embarrassing public launch failure like Vanguard TV-3 the year before. In the event that SCORE failed, they could simply claim that it was an ICBM test, and most of the launch crew also did not know 10B's true mission, as the missile was shipped to CCAS carrying a standard blunt Atlas RV and only the night before the launch was the satellite mounted on top of it. Orbital launches required a considerably different flight path than missiles, and during launch, the Range Safety Officer, who assumed it was a routine Atlas missile test, almost pressed the destruct button on noticing that the trajectory was "off", but he was quickly talked out of it. SCORE transmitted a tape-recorded Christmas greeting from President Eisenhower and operated for 13 days until the batteries ran down. The satellite, which remained attached to the spent Atlas, decayed from orbit on January 21, 1959. With a combined weight of 8,660 pounds (3,930 kg), it held the record for largest artificial object in space for a number of years. The lack of a telemetry system meant that limited data on the missile's performance was available, however all systems appeared to operate correctly throughout powered flight other than the autopilot. The roll program was executed properly, however the missile pitched up approximately 11° from the planned flight trajectory. A backup command from the guidance system at T+138 seconds corrected it, and the malfunction was believed to be due to a slight misalignment of the gyro canister.

On January 16, 1959, Missile 13B, which was the backup booster for SCORE and carried the same modified hardware, was launched from LC-14 but lost thrust slightly under a minute into launch and fell into the Atlantic Ocean. The exact cause of the failure could not be determined because just like 10B, the missile was not carrying a telemetry package due to the intended mission of flying an Atlas to its maximum range, which required stripping the missile down to as light a weight as possible. Film and photographic data showed an apparently normal flight for the first minute of launch, after which 13B disappeared behind clouds. Tracking data showed that the missile was on course and there was no indication of any abnormalities until T+100 seconds when the engines began gimbaling in all three axes, resulting in erratic attitude rates and complete loss of control six seconds later. Propulsion system performance started decaying at T+109 seconds and the engines completely shut down at T+121 seconds. Nose cone telemetry showed an increase in pitch and yaw rates at that point and this condition existed until impact with the ocean about 170 miles downrange and final signal loss at T+281 seconds. The failure was believed to have been caused by exhaust gases being sucked into the thrust section and causing overheating.

The Atlas B test program concluded with the successful flight of Missile 11B on February 4, which reached an apogee of 610 miles (980 km). Missile performance exhibited two small abnormalities - high vibration in the booster engine hydraulic pump for the first 17 seconds of flight and slightly high booster engine thrust, the latter of which was attributed to a malfunction of the ground support equipment on LC-11.

All Atlas B launches were conducted from Cape Canaveral Air Force Station, at Launch Complexes 11, 13 and 14.

== Launch history ==
Flight No.	Date/Time (GMT)	Pad	Serial	Apogee	Outcome	Remarks
1	19 July 1958, 17:36	LC-11	3B	6 mi (10 km)	Failure	Flight control failure. Missile broke up T+43 seconds. Flight considered a "partial success" because the propulsion system functioned normally until vehicle breakup.
2	2 August 1958, 22:16	LC-13	4B	560 mi (900 km)	Success	
3	29 August 1958, 04:30	LC-11	5B	560 mi (900 km)	Success	
4	14 September 1958, 05:24	LC-14	8B	560 mi (900 km)	Success	
5	18 September 1958, 21:27	LC-13	6B	62 mi (100 km)	Failure	Turbopump failure followed by missile self-destruction at T+82 seconds.
6	18 November 1958, 04:00	LC-11	9B	500 mi (800 km)	Partial failure	Excessive fuel consumption by the sustainer engine led to premature cutoff. This vehicle was equipped with redesigned turbopumps following the failure of Missile 6B.
7	29 November 1958, 02:27	LC-14	12B	560 mi (900 km)	Success	First full-range test flight
8	18 December 1958, 22:02	LC-11	10B	N/A	Success	Placed SCORE satellite into 115 mi × 922 mi (185 km × 1,484 km) x 32.3° orbit. First use of an Atlas for a space launch. Vehicle 10B included several custom modifications for this flight.
9	16 January 1959, 04:00	LC-14	13B	62 mi (100 km)	Failure	Loss of thrust at T+121 seconds due to suspected overheating in the thrust section (there was no telemetry system on this missile).
10	4 February 1959, 08:01	LC-11	11B	560 mi (900 km)	Success	

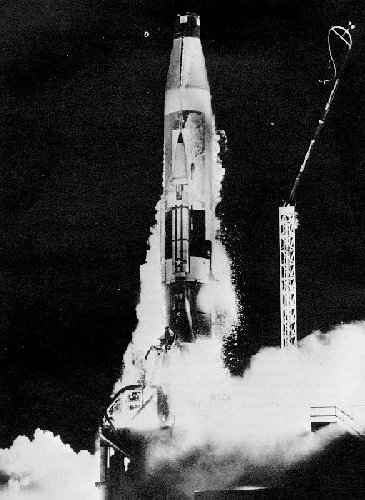
Flight 1 (Atlas 3B), 19 July 1958

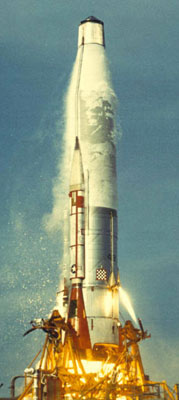
Flight 2 (Atlas 4B), 2 August 1958

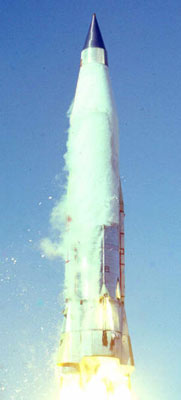
Flight 5 (Atlas 6B), 18 September 1958

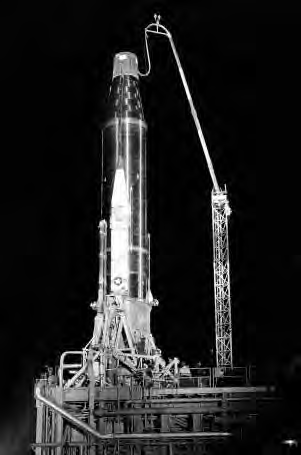
Flight 6 (Atlas 9B), November 1958

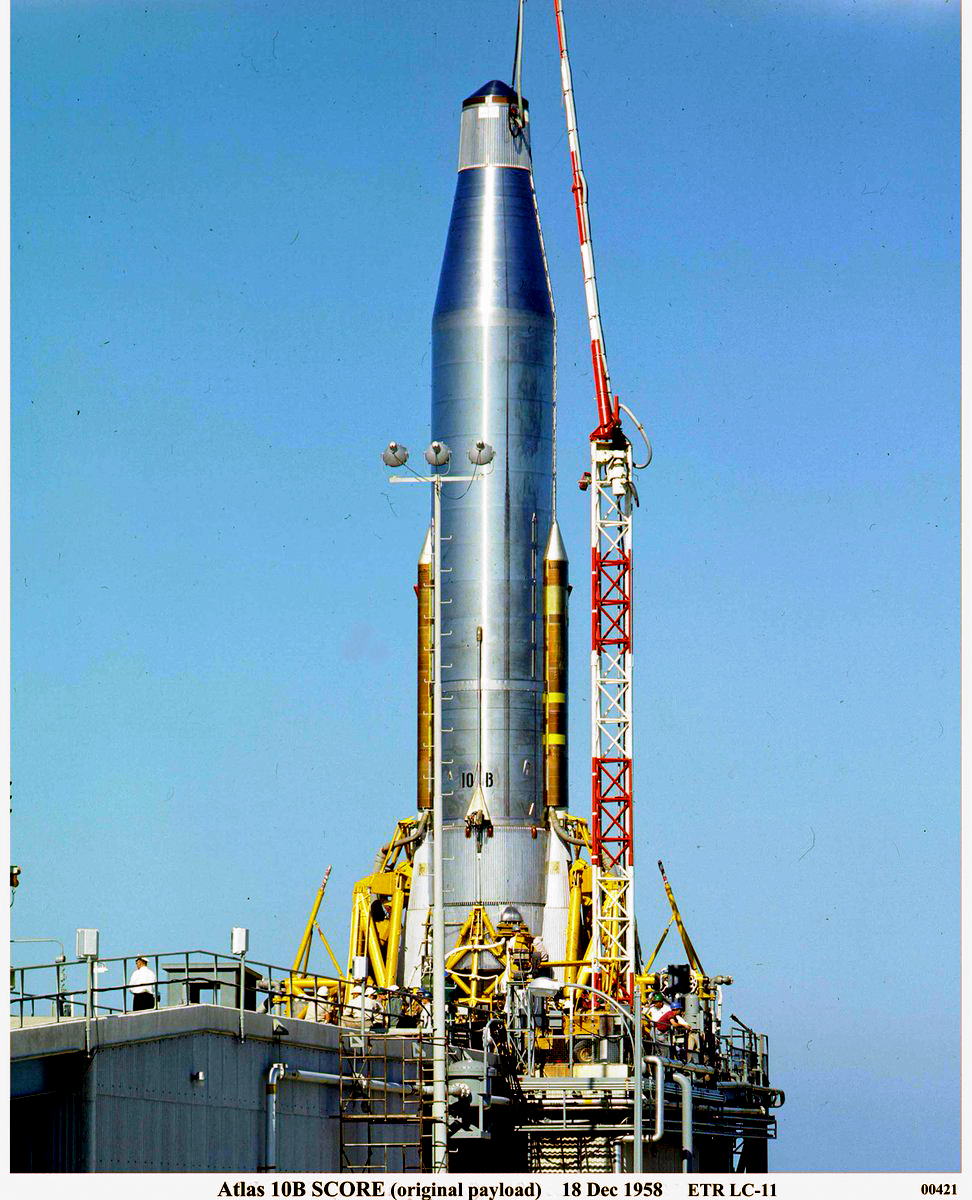
Flight 8 (Atlas 10B) with SCORE payload, 18 December 1958

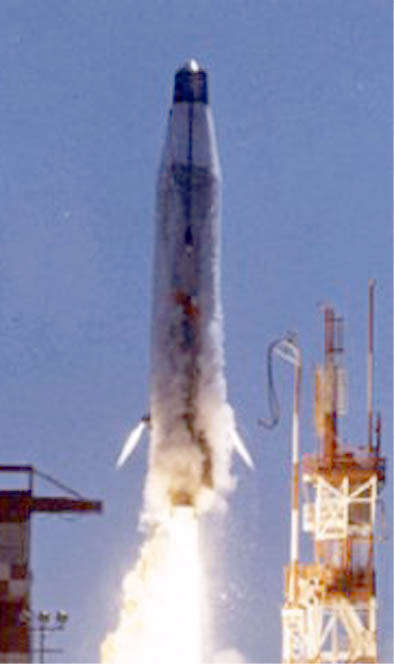
Atlas B lift-off

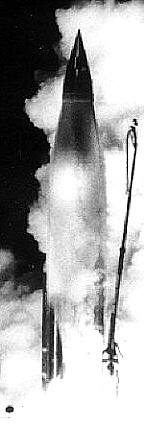
Atlas B lift-off

== See also ==
- SM-65 Atlas
