= Intelsat VA F-12 =

Communications satellite

Intelsat VA F-12 → Intelsat 512
- Mission type: Communication
- Operator: Intelsat
- COSPAR ID: 1985-087A
- SATCAT no.: 16101
- Mission duration: 7 years (planned)

Spacecraft properties
- Bus: Intelsat VA
- Manufacturer: Ford Aerospace
- Launch mass: 1981 kg
- Dry mass: 1098 kg
- Dimensions: 1.66 x 2.1 x 1.77 metres
- Power: 1800 watts

Start of mission
- Launch date: 29 September 1985, 23:36:00 UTC
- Rocket: Atlas G-Centaur D1AR (AC-65)
- Launch site: CCAFS, LC-36B
- Contractor: General Dynamics

End of mission
- Disposal: Graveyard orbit
- Deactivated: July 1998

Orbital parameters
- Reference system: Geocentric orbit
- Regime: Geostationary orbit
- Longitude: 34.5° West (1985-1991); 1.0° West (1991-1994); 21.5° West (1994-1996); 55.5° West (1996-1998)
- Epoch: 29 September 1985

Transponders
- Band: 26 C-band; 6 Ku-band

Intelsat VA F-12, then named Intelsat 512, was a communications satellite operated by Intelsat. Launched in September 1985, it was the twelfth of fifteen Intelsat V satellites to be launched. The Intelsat V series was constructed by Ford Aerospace, based on the Intelsat VA satellite bus. Intelsat VA F-12 was part of an advanced series of satellites designed to provide greater telecommunications capacity for Intelsat's global network.

== Satellite ==
The satellite was box-shaped, measuring 1.66 by 2.1 by 1.77 metres; solar arrays spanned 15.9 metres tip to tip. The arrays, supplemented by nickel-hydrogen batteries during eclipse, provided 1800 watts of power at mission onset, approximately 1280 watts at the end of its seven-year design life. The payload housed 26 C-band and 6 Ku-band transponders. It could accommodate 15,000 two-way voice circuits and two TV channels simultaneously. It also provided maritime communications for ships at sea.

== Launch ==
The satellite was successfully launched into space on 29 September 1985, at 23:36:00 UTC, by means of an Atlas G-Centaur D1AR vehicle from the Cape Canaveral Air Force Station, Florida, United States. It had a launch mass of 1981 kg. The satellite was deactivated in July 1998.
