= Rocketdyne LR-101 =

Vernier thruster developed by Rocketdyne

LR-101-NA-11
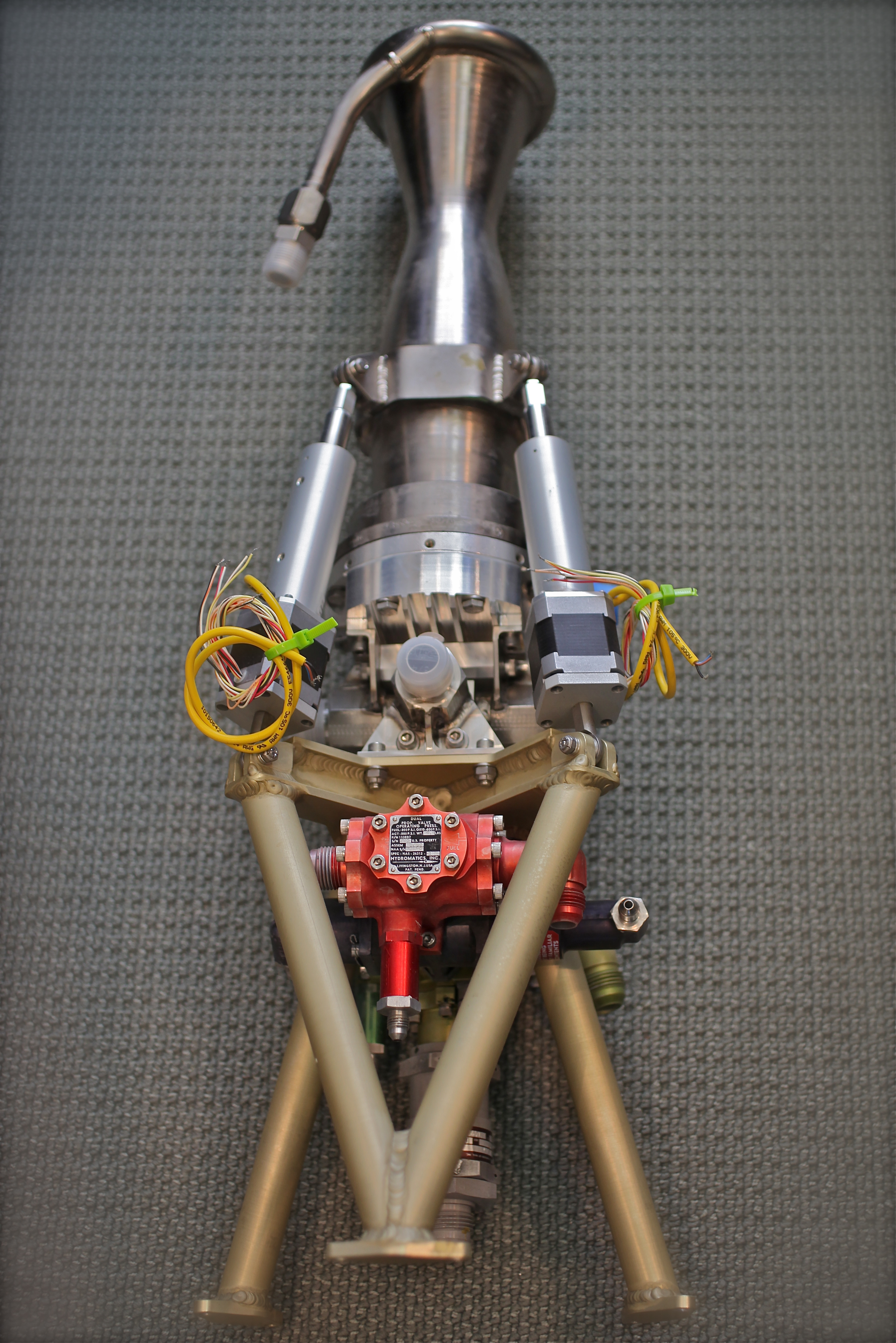
- LR-101 Thrust chamber on a gimbal mount designed by Robert C. Truax
- Country of origin: United States
- Date: 1958
- Designer: Rocketdyne
- Manufacturer: Rocketdyne
- Application: Vernier Thruster
- Status: Retired

Liquid-fuel engine
- Propellant: LOX / RP-1
- Cycle: Gas Generator / Pressure-fed

Configuration
- Chamber: 1

Performance
- Thrust, vacuum: (Pressure-fed) 830 pounds-force (3,700 N)
- Thrust, sea-level: (Tank-fed) 1,017 pounds-force (4,520 N); (Pressure-fed) 1,060 pounds-force (4,700 N)
- Chamber pressure: (Tank-fed) 2.1 MPa (300 psi); (Pressure-fed) 2.45 MPa (355 psi)
- Specific impulse, sea-level: (Tank-fed) 198.7 seconds (1.949 km/s); (Pressure-fed) 209.8 seconds (2.057 km/s)
- Burn time: Rated for 184 Sec

Used in
- Thor, Atlas, Delta

The Rocketdyne LR-101 is a fixed thrust, single start vernier thruster developed by Rocketdyne in the mid-to-late fifties and used in the Atlas, Thor and Delta launch vehicles until 1990.

Each of these rockets used two LR-101 secondary engines to provide yaw, pitch and roll control during their ascent to space. The pair of LR-101 vernier thrusters would receive their propellant flow from the turbopumps of the sustainer engine until it was shut off. After sustainer burnout, this pair of thrusters would switch to feed off the remaining propellant, effectively becoming a Pressure-fed engine. The remaining fuel would then be spent for the last trajectory corrections and stabilization of the rocket before separating the payload.

== Variants ==
Due to several modifications the LR-101 underwent over the years, there are many different variants of this engine (LR101-NA-3, LR101-NA-7, LR101-NA-9, LR101-NA-11, LR101-NA-13, etc).

One of the first changes was the downrating of the engine to a lower thrust level, both because the engine provided far more thrust than required to steer the rocket and to save fuel for the main engines. Another major change was the replacement of the original pyrotechnical ignition system with an igniter using a hypergolic fuel mixture composed of Triethylaluminum and Triethylborane.

Additionally, the Atlas, Thor and Delta Rockets each possessed unique aerodynamically shielded gimbal mounts in the vicinity of their primary engines to provide large arcs for the vernier thrusters. While the pair of LR-101s on the Atlas was mounted radially above the booster engines of the vehicle, on the Thor they were placed at the base of the vehicle.

== Role in experimental rocketry ==
The LR-101 is one of the most common vernier thrusters utilized in American rocketry and has become a sought-after object for item collectors and builders of amateur rockets. Rocket engineer Robert C. Truax, who had led the initial design studies for the PGM-17 Thor missile had planned on propelling his 'X-3 Volksrocket' with four Rocketdyne LR-101 engines, but despite many test firings the rocket never left the ground.

On the 'Galactic Aztec', the engine used RP-2 (Kerosene) as a propellant instead of RP-1, which was utilized in the SM-65 Atlas and PGM-17 Thor ballistic missiles as well as the later commercial Delta rockets.

== See also ==
- SM-65 Atlas - The first rocket to use the LR-101
- Rocketdyne - The designer bureau of the LR-101
