= List of Atlas launches (1970–1979) =

== Launch statistics ==
=== Rocket configurations ===
- Atlas-Agena
- Atlas SLV
- Atlas E/F

=== Launch sites ===
- Cape Canaveral LC-13
- Cape Canaveral SLC-36A
- Cape Canaveral SLC-36B
- Vandenberg LC-576A
- Vandenberg SLC-3E
- Vandenberg SLC-3W

=== Launch outcomes ===
- Success
- Partial failure
- Failure

== 1970 ==
Date/Time (UTC)	Rocket	S/N	Launch site	Payload	Function	Orbit	Outcome	Remarks
1970-02-08	Atlas E/F-Trident	96F	VAFB LC-576A-3		REV test	Suborbital	Success	
1970-03-13	Atlas E/F-Trident	28F	VAFB LC-576A-3		REV test	Suborbital	Success	
1970-05-30	Atlas E/F-Trident	91F	VAFB LC-576A-3		REV test	Suborbital	Success	
1970-06-09	Atlas E/F	92F	VAFB LC-576A-1		REV test	Suborbital	Success	
1970-06-19; 11:37	Atlas-Agena D SLV-3A	5201A	CCAFS LC-13	AFP-720 (Rhyolite-1)	ELINT	GTO	Success	
1970-09-01; 01:00	Atlas-Agena D SLV-3A	5203A	CCAFS LC-13	AFP-827 (Canyon-3)	ELINT	GTO	Success	
1970-11-30; 22:40:05	Atlas-Centaur SLV-3C	AC-21	CCAFS LC-36B	OAO-B	Astronomy	LEO (target)	Failure	Payload fairing failed to separate
1970-12-22; 08:38	Atlas E/F-Trident	105F	VAFB LC-576A-3		REV test	Suborbital	Success	

== 1971 ==
Date/Time (UTC)	Rocket	S/N	Launch site	Payload	Function	Orbit	Outcome	Remarks
1971-01-26; 00:36:03	Atlas-Centaur SLV-3C	AC-25	CCAFS LC-36A	Intelsat IV F2	Comsat	GTO	Success	
1971-04-05	Atlas E/F	85F	VAFB LC-576A-1		REV test	Suborbital	Success	
1971-05-09; 01:11:02	Atlas-Centaur SLV-3C	AC-24	CCAFS LC-36A	Mariner 8	Mars probe	Heliocentric (target)	Failure	Damaged circuit board in Centaur resulted in control failure and engine shutdown at T+365 seconds.
1971-05-30; 22:23:04	Atlas-Centaur SLV-3C	AC-23	CCAFS LC-36B	Mariner 9	Mars probe	Heliocentric	Success	
1971-06-29; 13:10	Atlas E/F-Trident	103F	VAFB LC-576A-3		REV test	Suborbital	Success	
1971-08-07; 00:11	Atlas E/F-OV1	76F	VAFB LC-576A-2	OV1-20; OV1-21		LEO	Success	
1971-09-01	Atlas E/F	74F	VAFB LC-576A-1		REV test	Suborbital	Success	
1971-12-04; 22:33	Atlas-Agena D SLV-3A	5503A	CCAFS LC-13	AFP-827 (Canyon-4)	ELINT	GTO (target)	Failure	Sustainer shut down due to gas generator failure. RSO T+62 seconds.
1971-12-20; 01:10:04	Atlas-Centaur SLV-3C	AC-26	CCAFS LC-36A	Intelsat IV F3	Comsat	GTO	Success	

== 1972 ==
Date/Time (UTC)	Rocket	S/N	Launch site	Payload	Function	Orbit	Outcome	Remarks
1972-01-23; 00:12:04	Atlas-Centaur SLV-3C	AC-28	CCAFS LC-36B	Intelsat IV F4	Comsat	GTO	Success	
1972-03-03; 01:49:04	Atlas-Centaur SLV-3C	AC-27	CCAFS LC-36A	Pioneer 10	Jupiter probe	Heliocentric	Success	First probe to visit Jupiter; Solar System escape velocity achieved on Jupiter fly-by
1972-06-13; 21:53:04	Atlas-Centaur SLV-3C	AC-29	CCAFS LC-36B	Intelsat IV F5	Comsat	GTO	Success	
1972-08-21; 10:28:02	Atlas-Centaur SLV-3C	AC-22	CCAFS LC-36B	OAO-3	Astronomy	LEO	Success	Final flight of Atlas-Centaur SLV-3C
1972-10-02; 20:10	Atlas E/F-Burner-2A	102F	VAFB LC-576A-1	P72-1		LEO	Success	
1972-12-20; 22:20	Atlas-Agena D SLV-3A	5204A	CCAFS LC-13	AFP-827 (Canyon-5)	ELINT	GTO	Success	

== 1973 ==
Date/Time (UTC)	Rocket	S/N	Launch site	Payload	Function	Orbit	Outcome	Remarks
1973-03-06; 09:30	Atlas-Agena D SLV-3A	5202A	CCAFS LC-13	AFP-720 (Rhyolite-2)	ELINT	GTO	Success	
1973-04-06; 02:11:00	Atlas-Centaur SLV-3D	AC-30	CCAFS LC-36B	Pioneer 11	Planetary probe	Heliocentric	Success	Maiden flight of Atlas-Centaur SLV-3D; First probe to visit Saturn; Solar System escape velocity achieved on Jupiter fly-by
1973-08-23; 22:57:02	Atlas-Centaur SLV-3D	AC-31	CCAFS LC-36A	Intelsat IV F7	Comsat	GTO	Success	
1973-08-29	Atlas E/F	78F	VAFB LC-576A-3		REV test	Suborbital	Success	
1973-09-30	Atlas E/F	108F	VAFB LC-576A-1		REV test	Suborbital	Success	
1973-11-03; 05:45:00	Atlas-Centaur SLV-3D	AC-34	CCAFS LC-36B	Mariner 10	Planetary probe	Heliocentric	Success	

== 1974 ==
Date/Time (UTC)	Rocket	S/N	Launch site	Payload	Function	Orbit	Outcome	Remarks
1974-03-06	Atlas E/F	73F	VAFB LC-576A-1		REV test	Suborbital	Success	
1974-03-23	Atlas E/F	97F	VAFB LC-576A-3		REV test	Suborbital	Success	
1974-05-01	Atlas E/F	54F	VAFB LC-576A-1		REV test	Suborbital	Success	
1974-06-28	Atlas E/F	82F	VAFB LC-576A-1		REV test	Suborbital	Success	
1974-07-14; 05:17	Atlas E/F-PTS	69F	VAFB SLC-3W	P73-3		LEO	Success	
1974-09-08	Atlas E/F	80F	VAFB LC-576A-1		REV test	Suborbital	Success	
1974-10-14; 04:46	Atlas E/F	31F	VAFB LC-576A-3		REV test	Suborbital	Success	
1974-11-21; 23:43:59	Atlas-Centaur SLV-3D	AC-32	CCAFS LC-36B	Intelsat IV F8	Comsat	GTO	Success	

== 1975 ==
Date/Time (UTC)	Rocket	S/N	Launch site	Payload	Function	Orbit	Outcome	Remarks
1975-02-20; 23:35:00	Atlas-Centaur SLV-3D	AC-33	CCAFS LC-36A	Intelsat IV F6	Comsat	GTO (target)	Failure	Improper separation of a lanyard during booster jettison reset the Atlas programmer and caused erroneous flight path. RSO T+413 seconds.
1975-04-13; 00:51	Atlas E/F-Star-17A	71F	VAFB SLC-3W	P72-2		LEO (target)	Failure	Rocket damaged by explosion of LOX/RP-1 glob in flame trench during launch, leading to sustainer engine failure during ascent. RSO T+303 seconds.
1975-05-22; 22:04:00	Atlas-Centaur SLV-3D	AC-35	CCAFS LC-36A	Intelsat IV F1	Comsat	GTO	Success	
1975-06-18; 09:00:00	Atlas-Agena D SLV-3A	5506A	CCAFS LC-13	AFP-827 (Canyon-6)	ELINT	GTO	Success	
1975-09-26; 00:17:00	Atlas-Centaur SLV-3D	AC-36	CCAFS LC-36B	Intelsat IVA F1	Comsat	GTO	Success	

== 1976 ==
Date/Time (UTC)	Rocket	S/N	Launch site	Payload	Function	Orbit	Outcome	Remarks
1976-01-29; 23:56	Atlas-Centaur SLV-3D	AC-37	CCAFS LC-36B	Intelsat IVA F2	Comsat	GTO	Success	
1976-04-30; 19:12	Atlas E/F-MSD	59F	VAFB SLC-3W	OPS-6431 (NOSS-1)	ELINT	LEO	Success	
1976-05-13; 22:28	Atlas-Centaur SLV-3D	AC-38	CCAFS LC-36A	Comstar D1	Comsat	GTO	Success	
1976-07-22; 22:04:00	Atlas-Centaur SLV-3D	AC-40	CCAFS LC-36B	Comstar D2	Comsat	GTO	Success	

== 1977 ==
Date/Time (UTC)	Rocket	S/N	Launch site	Payload	Function	Orbit	Outcome	Remarks
1977-05-23; 18:13:00	Atlas-Agena D SLV-3A	5507A	CCAFS LC-13	AFP-827 (Canyon-7)	ELINT	GTO	Success	
1977-05-26; 21:47:01	Atlas-Centaur SLV-3D	AC-39	CCAFS LC-36A	Intelsat IVA F4	Comsat	GTO	Success	
1977-06-23; 09:16	Atlas E/F-SGS-1	65F	VAFB SLC-3W	NTS-2	Technology	MEO	Success	
1977-08-12; 06:29:31	Atlas-Centaur SLV-3D	AC-45	CCAFS LC-36B	HEAO-1	Astronomy	LEO	Success	
1977-09-30; 01:02:59	Atlas-Centaur SLV-3D	AC-43	CCAFS LC-36A	Intelsat IVA F5	Comsat	GTO	Failure	Corroded plumbing resulted in a gas generator leak and thrust section fire during ascent. Vehicle self-destructed T+55 seconds.
1977-12-08; 17:45	Atlas E/F-MSD	50F	VAFB SLC-3W	OPS-8781 (NOSS-2)	ELINT	LEO	Success	
1977-12-11; 22:45:01	Atlas-Agena D SLV-3A	5504A	CCAFS LC-13	OPS-4258 (Aquacade-3)	ELINT	GTO	Success	

== 1978 ==
Date/Time (UTC)	Rocket	S/N	Launch site	Payload	Function	Orbit	Outcome	Remarks
1978-01-07; 00:15:00	Atlas-Centaur SLV-3D	AC-46	CCAFS LC-36B	Intelsat IVA F3	Comsat	GTO	Success	
1978-02-09; 21:17:01	Atlas-Centaur SLV-3D	AC-44	CCAFS LC-36A	FLTSATCOM-1	Comsat	GTO	Success	
1978-02-22; 23:44	Atlas E/F-SVS	64F	VAFB SLC-3E	GPS-1	Navigation	MEO	Success	
1978-03-31; 23:36:01	Atlas-Centaur SLV-3D	AC-48	CCAFS LC-36B	Intelsat IVA F6	Comsat	GTO	Success	
1978-04-07; 00:45:01	Atlas-Agena D SLV-3A	5505A	CCAFS LC-13	OPS-8790 Aquacade-4	ELINT	GTO	Success	Final flight of standard Atlas-Agena
1978-05-13; 10:34	Atlas E/F-SVS	49F	VAFB SLC-3E	GPS-2	Navigation satellite	MEO	Success	
1978-05-20; 13:13:00	Atlas-Centaur SLV-3D	AC-50	CCAFS LC-36A	Pioneer Venus Orbiter	Venus probe	Heliocentric	Success	
1978-06-27; 01:12	Atlas E/F-Agena D	23F	VAFB SLC-3W	Seasat	Remote sensing	LEO	Success	Final Atlas-Agena flight, using a modified Atlas F missile.
1978-06-29; 22:24:59	Atlas-Centaur SLV-3D	AC-41	CCAFS LC-36B	Comstar D3	Comsat	GTO	Success	
1978-08-08; 07:33	Atlas-Centaur SLV-3D	AC-51	CCAFS LC-36A	Pioneer Venus Multiprobe	Venus probe	Heliocentric	Success	
1978-10-07; 00:28	Atlas E/F-SVS	47F	VAFB SLC-3E	GPS-3	Navigation satellite	MEO	Success	
1978-10-13; 11:23	Atlas E/F-Star-37S-ISS	29F	VAFB SLC-3W	TIROS-N	Weather satellite	LEO	Success	
1978-11-13; 05:24	Atlas-Centaur SLV-3D	AC-52	CCAFS LC-36B	HEAO-2	Astronomy	LEO	Success	
1978-12-11; 03:59	Atlas E/F-SVS	39F	VAFB SLC-3E	GPS-4	Navigation satellite	MEO	Success	

== 1979 ==
Date/Time (UTC)	Rocket	S/N	Launch site	Payload	Function	Orbit	Outcome	Remarks
24 February 1979; 08:20	Atlas E/F-OIS	27F	VAFB, SLC-3W	Solwind	Solar	LEO	Success	
4 May 1979; 18:57:00	Atlas-Centaur SLV-3D	AC-47	CCAFS, LC-36A	FLTSATCOM-2	Comsat	GTO	Success	
27 June 1979; 15:51:59	Atlas E/F-Star-37S-ISS	25F	VAFB, SLC-3W	NOAA-6 (NOAA-A)	Weather satellite	SSO	Success	
20 September 1979; 05:28	Atlas-Centaur SLV-3D	AC-53	CCAFS, LC-36B	HEAO-3	Astronomy	LEO	Success	

== Photo gallery ==
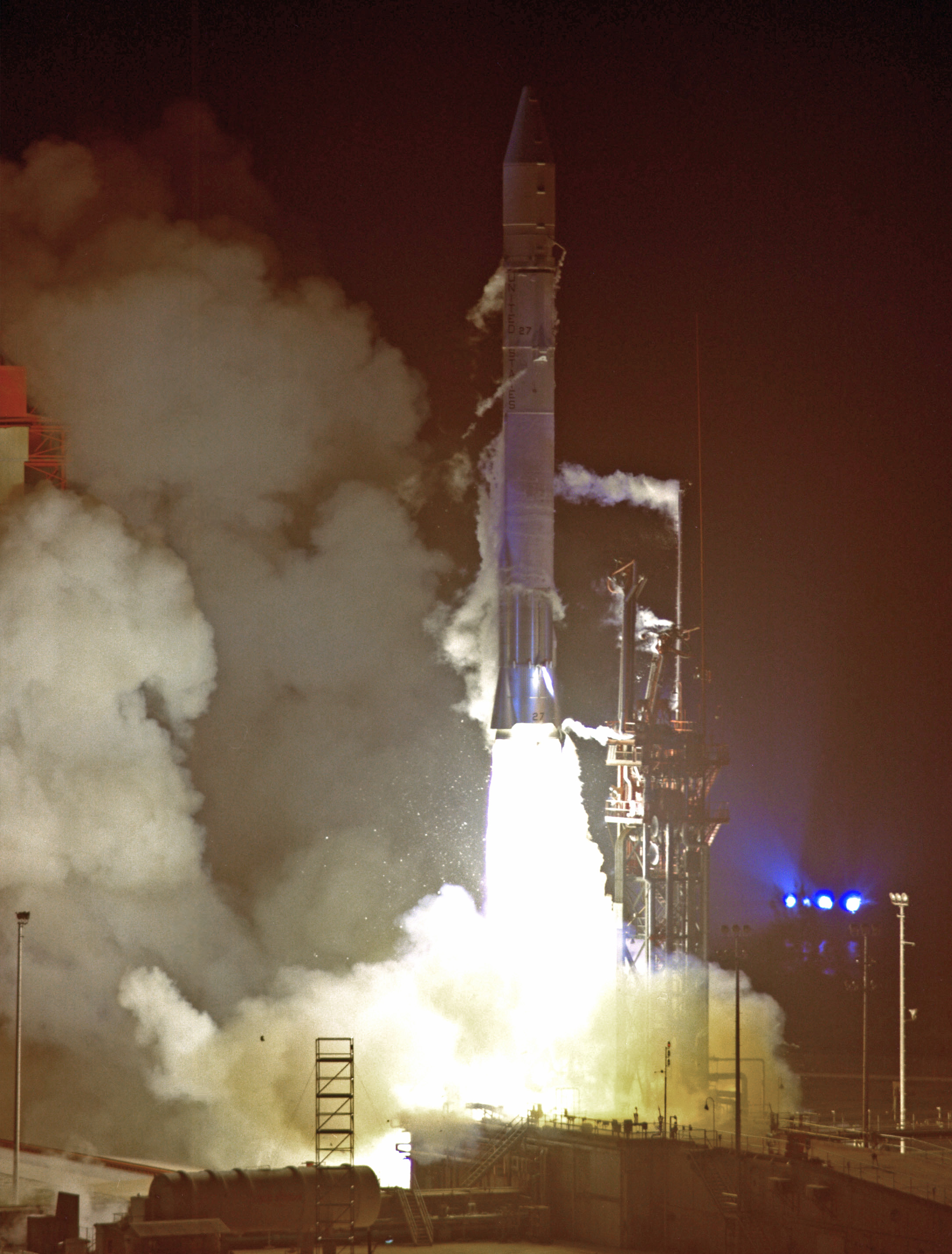
Launch of Pioneer 10, the first probe to Jupiter and first probe to go beyond the planets of the Solar System

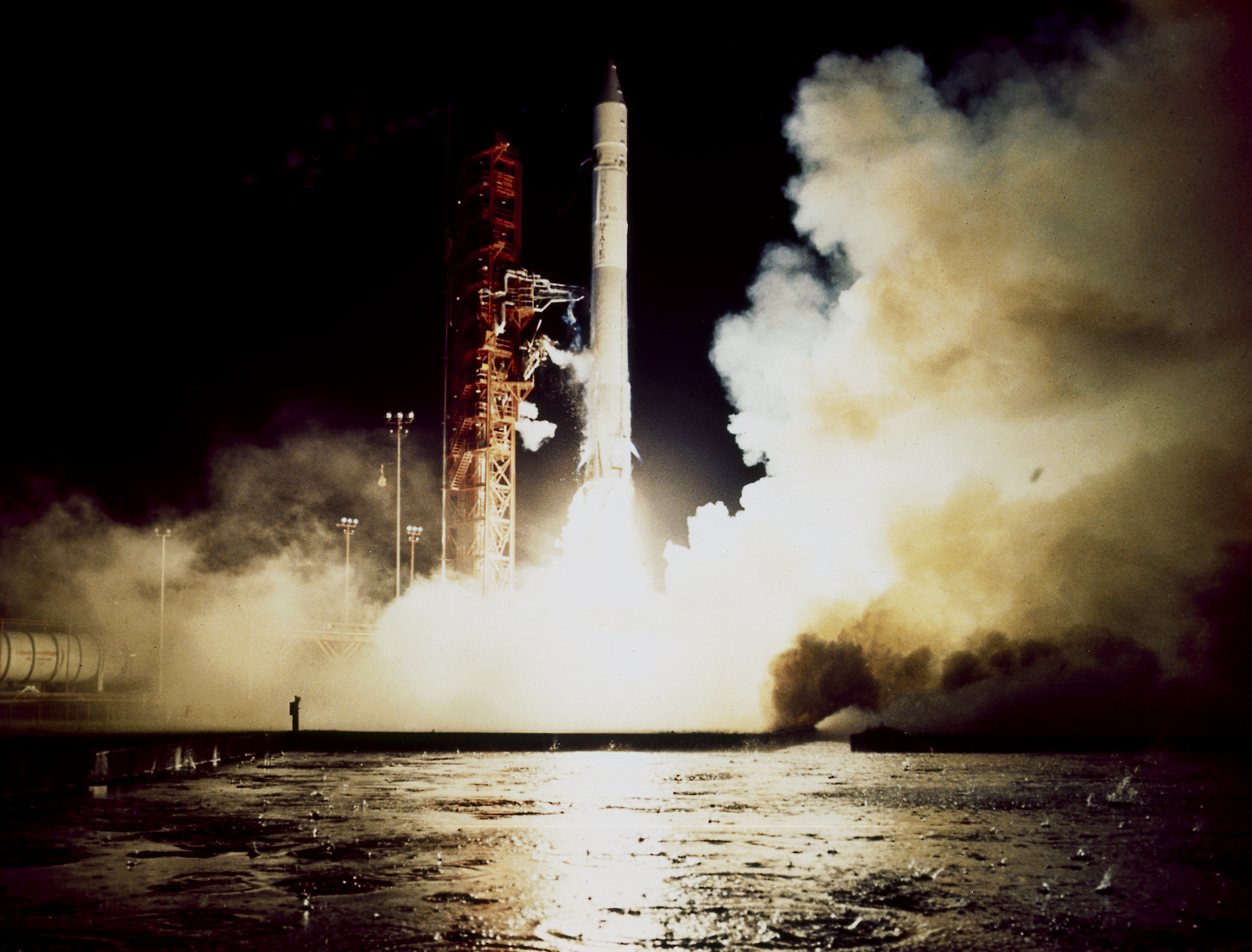
Maiden flight of the Atlas SLV-3D, launch of Pioneer 11, the first probe to visit Saturn

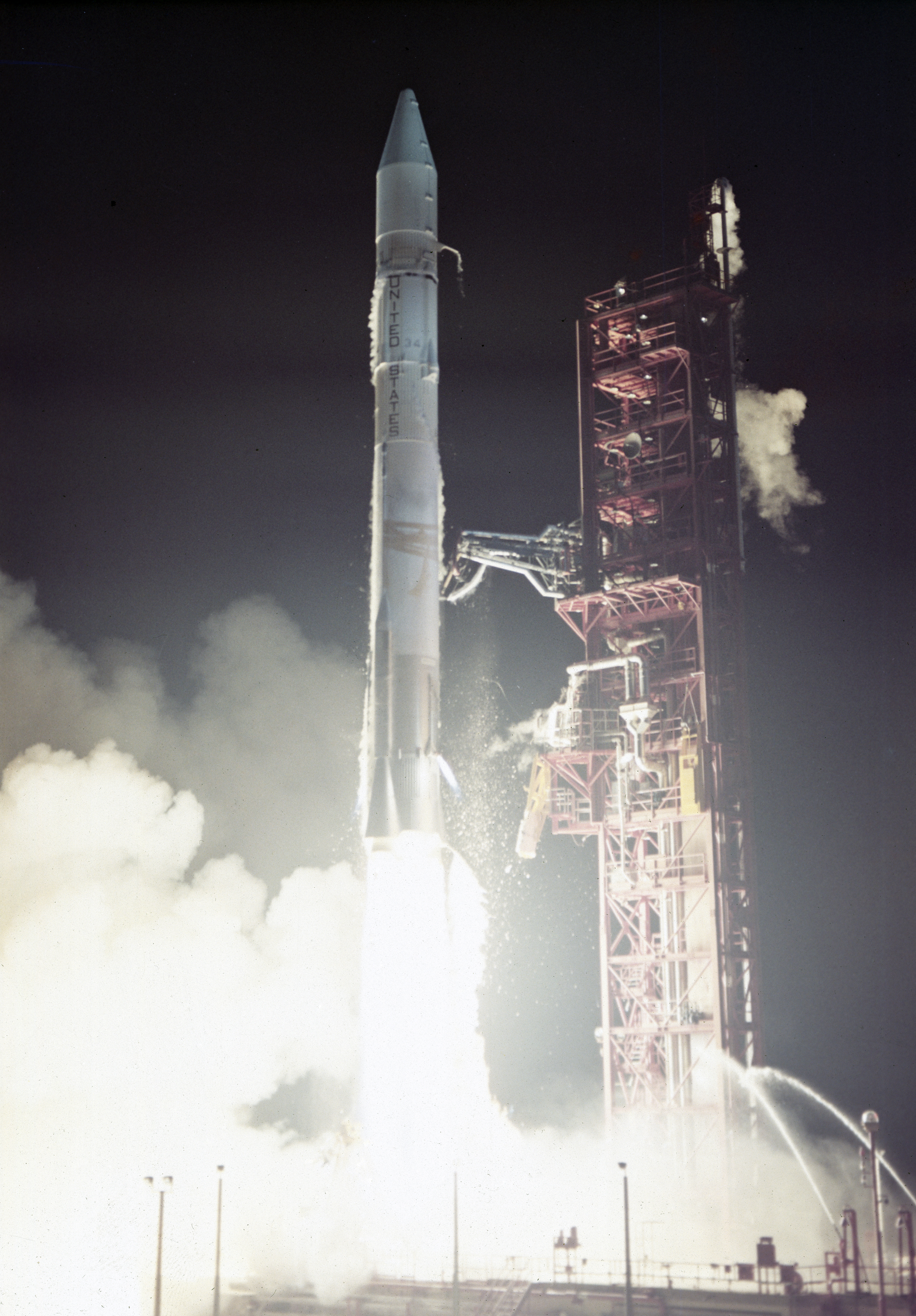
Launch of Mariner 10, the first probe to visit Mercury
