= Aquacade =

Aquacade may refer to:

- Billy Rose's Aquacade, aquatic show
- Rhyolite/Aquacade, US reconnaissance satellite program
