= Cape Canaveral Launch Complex 13 =

Former rocket launch site in Florida, USA

Launch Complex 13
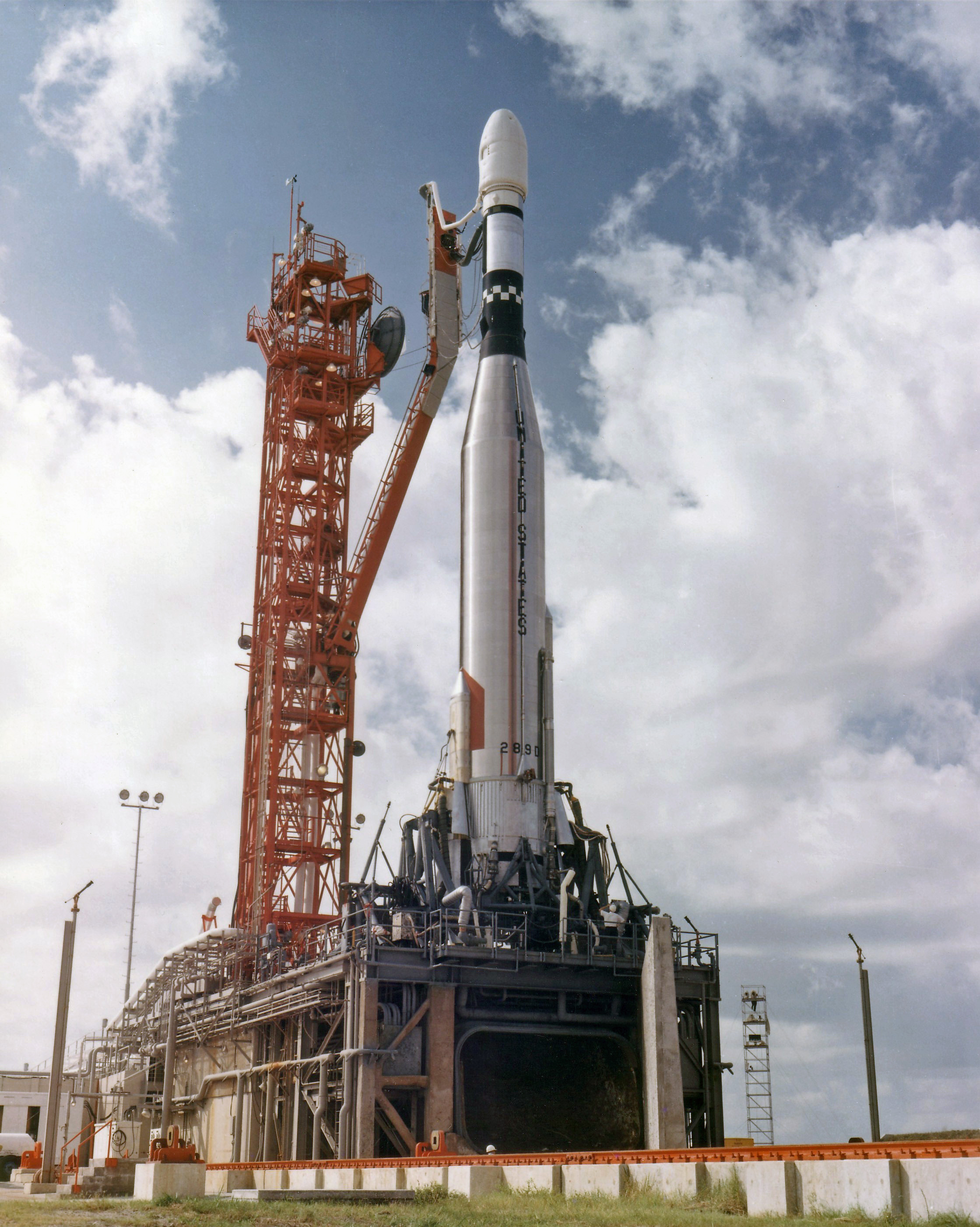
- Atlas with Mariner 3 at Launch Complex 13 prior to launch on 4 November 1964
- Interactive map of Launch Complex 13
- Launch site: Cape Canaveral Space Force Station
- Location: 28.4859°N 80.5444°W
- Time zone: UTC−05:00 (EST)
  - Summer (DST): UTC−04:00 (EDT)
- Short name: LC-13
- Operator: United States Space Force (owner); Phantom Space and Vaya Space (tenants, de jure); SpaceX (tenant, de facto)
- Total launches: 52
- Launch pad: 1, plus 2 landing sites
Launch history
- Status: Inactive
- First launch: August 2, 1958; Atlas B
- Last launch: April 7, 1978; Atlas-Agena (OPS 8790 / Aquacade)
- Associated rockets: Future: Daytona, Dauntless; Retired: SM-65 Atlas, Atlas-Agena
LZ-1 landing history
- Status: Retired
- Landings: 55
- First landing: December 22, 2015; Falcon 9 Full Thrust (Orbcomm OG-2)
- Last landing: October 2, 2026; Falcon Heavy (NROL-97)
- Associated rockets: Retired: Falcon 9, Falcon Heavy
LZ-2 landing history
- Status: Active
- Landings: 20
- First landing: February 6, 2018; Falcon Heavy (Falcon Heavy test flight)
- Last landing: October 2, 2026; Falcon Heavy (NROL-97)
- Associated rockets: Current: Falcon 9, Falcon Heavy

Launch Complex 13 (LC-13) is a launch pad located at Cape Canaveral Space Force Station in Florida. Situated within a series of complexes known as Missile Row, it was originally constructed for test launches of the SM-65 Atlas in 1958 and subsequently saw use for Atlas-Agena launches from 1963 to 1978. It was the most-used and longest-serving of the original four Atlas pads. (Note: The original four Atlas pads were LC-11, 12, 13 and 14.)

In January 2015, the land and remaining facilities at LC-13 were leased to SpaceX and was renovated for use as Landing Zone 1 and Landing Zone 2 (LZ-1 and LZ-2), the company's East Coast landing location for returning Falcon 9 and Falcon Heavy launch vehicle booster stages. As of 2026, LC-13 is only used for Falcon 9 and Falcon Heavy landings at LZ-2, with Phantom Space and Vaya Space holding the lease for future launches from their respective Daytona and Dauntless launch vehicles.

== History ==
Together with Launch Complexes 11, 12 and 14, LC-13 featured a more robust design than many contemporary pads due to the greater power of the Atlas compared to other rockets of the time. It was larger and featured a concrete launch pedestal that was 6 metres (20 ft) tall and a reinforced blockhouse. The rockets were delivered to the launch pad by a ramp on the south side of the launch pedestal.

=== SM-65 Atlas (1956–1961) ===
Starting in 1958, Atlas B, D, E and F missiles were tested from the complex.

One on-pad explosion occurred, the launch of Missile 51D in March 1960, which suffered combustion instability within seconds of launch. The Atlas fell back onto LC-13 in a huge fireball, putting the pad out of commission for the entire spring and summer of 1960.

Prior to the launch of Atlas 51D, the separate turbine exhaust ducts had been removed from the four Atlas pads at CCAS. A few weeks later, another Atlas exploded on LC-11 and it was then decided to reinstall the exhaust ducts, although it was considered unlikely that they had anything to do with the failures.

The next launch hosted from LC-13 was the first Atlas E test on October 11, exactly seven months after the accident with Missile 51D. Afterwards, LC-13 remained the primary East Coast testing site for Atlas E missiles, with Atlas F tests mainly running from LC-11 (Missile 2F in August 1961 was the only F-series Atlas launched from LC-13).

=== Atlas-Agena (1962–1978) ===
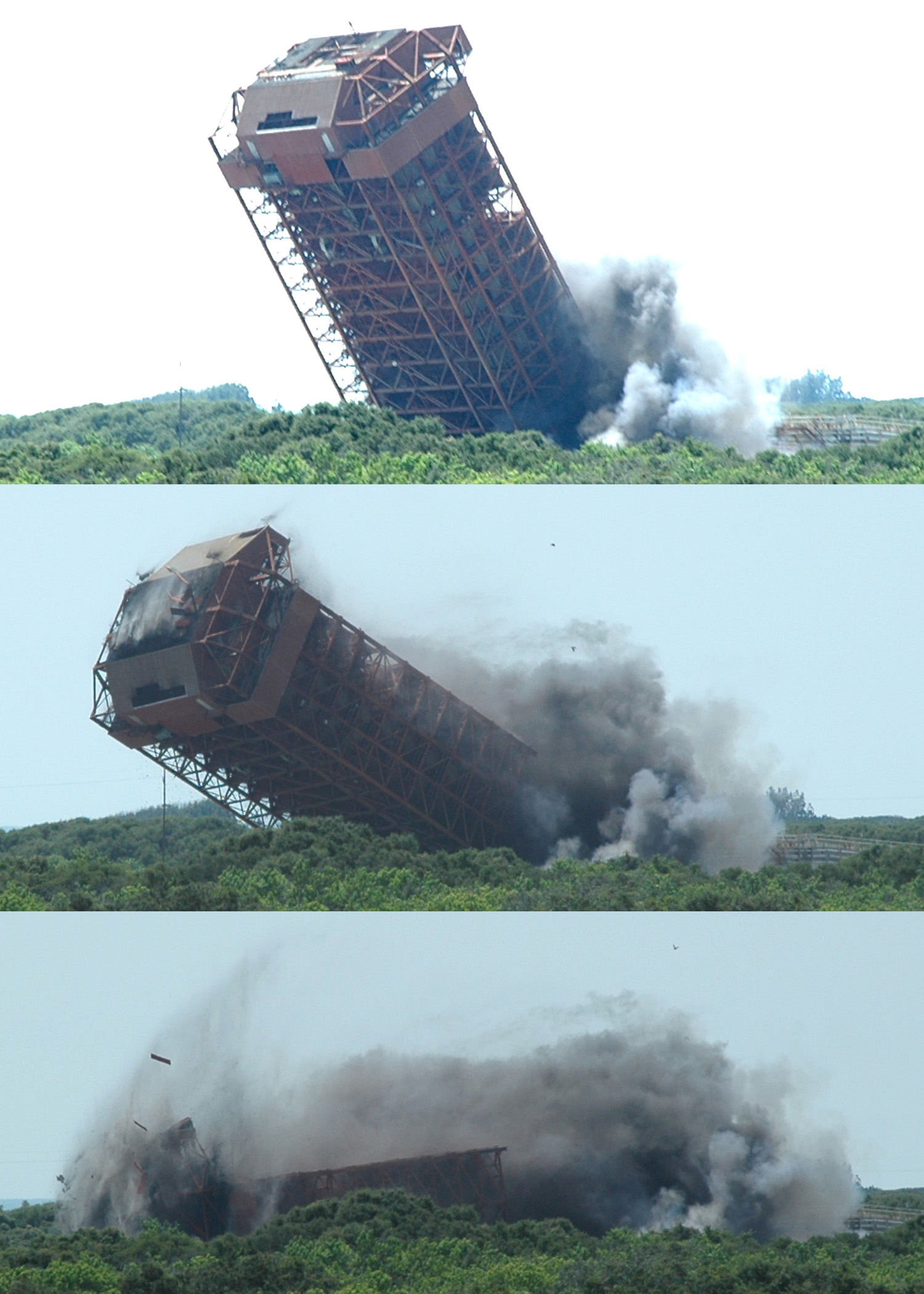
Demolition of mobile service tower in August 2005.

Between February 1962 and October 1963 the pad was converted for use by Atlas-Agena. The modifications were more extensive than the conversions of LC-12 and LC-14 with the mobile service tower being demolished and replaced with a new, larger tower. The first launch from the renovated pad was Vela 1 on October 17, 1963.

Significant launches included:

- Lunar Orbiter 1 on August 10, 1966. It photographed proposed landing sites for Apollo and Surveyor spacecraft on the Moon, and returned the first pictures of the Earth from lunar orbit.
- Several classified payloads for the National Reconnaissance Office, believed to include Canyon and Rhyolite satellites.

The final launch from LC-13 was a Rhyolite satellite on April 7, 1978, using an Atlas-Agena. The pad was deactivated from 1980 to 2015.

On April 16, 1984, it was added to the US National Register of Historic Places; however it was not maintained and gradually deteriorated. The mobile service tower was demolished on August 6, 2005 as a safety precaution due to structural damage by corrosion. (Note: The structure was so unstable that it could not be safely dismantled and had to be toppled by a controlled explosion before it could be taken apart. This has since become the standard method of dismantling launch complexes at Cape Canaveral and was used in the demolition of Titan infrastructure at LC-40 and LC-41, Atlas infrastructure at LC-36, and Delta infrastructure at SLC-17 and SLC-37.) The blockhouse was demolished in 2012.

=== Landing Zones 1 and 2 (from 2015) ===
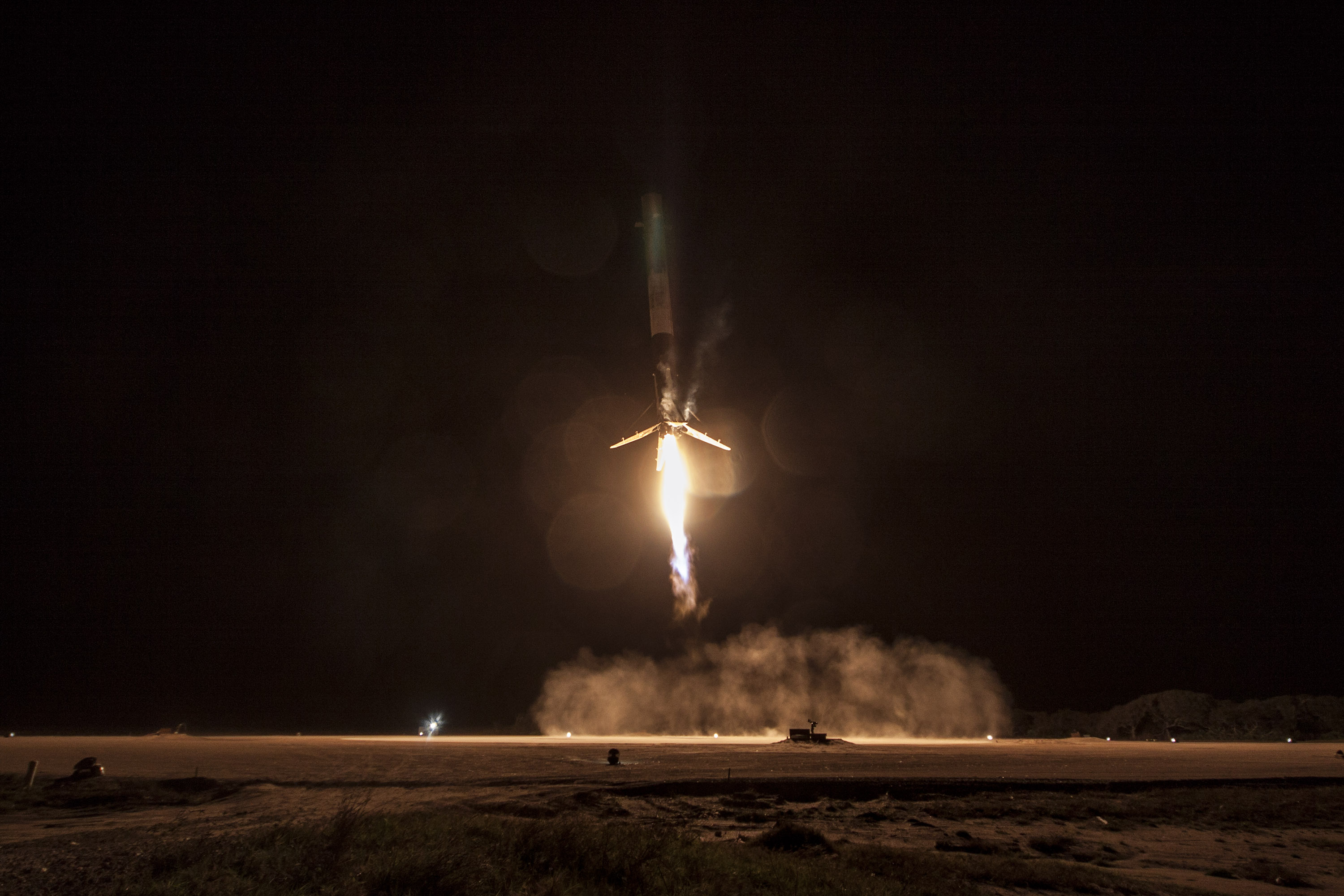
Falcon 9 Flight 20 first stage touching down on Landing Zone 1

On February 10, 2015, the Air Force announced that SpaceX signed a five-year lease for LC-13 to be used as a landing site for the first stage of their reusable launch vehicle, the Falcon 9. Over the next several months, the area east of the old launch architecture such as the mobile service tower track was torn up and transformed into a circular landing pad 195 m (640 ft) diameter named Landing Zone 1. Initially, the company planned to convert the facility into a set of five discrete landing zones, one large primary pad with four smaller alternate pads surrounding it. However, other changes in future SpaceX plans—most notably the cancellation of a reusable Falcon 9 second stage in favor of what eventually became Starship—resulted in only one pad being actually constructed. LZ-1 hosted its first landing on December 22, 2015 as part of Falcon 9's 20th flight, carrying eleven Orbcomm-OG2 satellites.

In July 2016, SpaceX applied for permission on building two additional landing pads at LC-13, to be used as a site for the two side boosters of Falcon Heavy. This eventually resulted in the construction of Landing Zone 2, located at the former complex retention pool north of the Atlas pad and sized 126 m (415 ft) in diameter. LZ-2 first saw use as part of Falcon Heavy's maiden flight on 6 February 2018, and was first used for a standard Falcon 9 booster on December 11, 2022 as part of Hakuto-R Mission 1.

During a press conference leading up to the launch of SpaceX Crew-11, William Gerstenmaier announced on July 30, 2025 that LZ-1 would be decommissioned following the flight on 1 August, to be replaced with landing areas located adjacent to their launch pads at Space Launch Complex 40 (named LZ-40) and Launch Complex 39A (named LZ-39A). LZ-40 entered service on February 13, 2026 with the Crew-12 mission. As of October 3, 2026, LZ-39A has not yet been completed and most duel booster landings from Falcon Heavy launches after LZ-1's decommissioning have taken place on LZ-2 and LZ-40, with the ViaSat-3 F3 being the first mission to do so.

On October 1, 2026, LZ-1 was briefly brought back into service to support a Falcon Heavy side-booster during the NROL-97 mission. This reactivation was due to both LZ-2 being the zone for the other side-booster, as well as LZ-40 which held a landed booster from the Crew-13 launch earlier that day.

=== Phantom Space and Vaya Space (from 2023) ===
On March 7, 2023, the United States Space Force announced that LC-13 was to be leased to companies Phantom Space Corporation and Vaya Space for respective use by their Daytona and Dauntless launch vehicles. Space Launch Delta 45 provided justification as a way to optimize the use of excess launch property and the Eastern Range along Florida's coastline. Unlike with the simultaneous leases granted to Stoke Space at LC-14 and ABL Space Systems at LC-15, the official transfer of operations was not performed until the expiration of the SpaceX lease at the end of July 2025.

== Launch and landing history ==
=== Launch statistics ===
Launch sites at Cape Canaveral Space Force Station and Kennedy Space Center
Active pads
Inactive leased pads
Inactive unleased pads
Repurposed pads, not used for launches
1 LC-39B
2 LC-39A
3 LC-48
4 SLC-41
5 SLC-40
6 LC-47
7 SLC-37
8 LC-34
9 SLC-20
10 LC-19
11 LC-16
12 LC-15
13 LC-14
14 LC-13 (LZ-2)
15 LC-12
16 LC-11
17 LC-36
18 LC-1, LC-2, LC-3, and LC-4
19 SLC-46
20 LC-21 and LC-22
21 LC-31 and LC-32
22 LC-18
23 SLC-17
24 LC-26
25 LC-5 and LC-6
26 LC-30
27 LC-25
28 LC-29
- Atlas
- Atlas-Agena
- Daytona
- Dauntless

All launches before 1964 and after 1970 operated by the United States Air Force. All other launches operated by NASA.

| No. | Date | Time (UTC) | Launch vehicle | Configuration | Payload | Result | Remarks |
|---|---|---|---|---|---|---|---|
| 1 | 2 August 1958 | 22:16 | SM-65 Atlas | Atlas B | Suborbital test | Success | First launch from LC-13 and maiden flight of the Atlas B. |
| 2 | 18 September 1958 | 21:27 | SM-65 Atlas | Atlas B | Suborbital test | Failure | Turbopump failure caused premature booster engine shutdown 80 seconds after launch, leading to vehicle breakup. |
| 3 | 14 April 1959 | 21:46 | SM-65 Atlas | Atlas D | Suborbital test | Failure | Maiden flight of the Atlas D. Valve closing failure at liftoff led to vehicle explosion 26 seconds after launch. |
| 4 | 6 June 1959 | 17:39 | SM-65 Atlas | Atlas D | Suborbital test | Failure | Valve failure during booster staging resulted in loss of tank pressure and vehicle breakup 157 seconds after launch. |
| 5 | 11 August 1959 | 18:01 | SM-65 Atlas | Atlas D | Suborbital test | Success | |
| 6 | 17 September 1959 | 02:09 | SM-65 Atlas | Atlas D | Suborbital test | Success | |
| 7 | 10 October 1959 | 03:10 | SM-65 Atlas | Atlas D | Suborbital test | Success | |
| 8 | 4 November 1959 | 21:37 | SM-65 Atlas | Atlas D | Suborbital test | Partial failure | Impactor prediction system malfunction led to erroneous shutdown by range safety officer, leading to shorter than planned trajectory. |
| 9 | 24 November 1959 | 19:48 | SM-65 Atlas | Atlas D | Suborbital test | Success | |
| 10 | 9 December 1959 | 00:10 | SM-65 Atlas | Atlas D | Suborbital test | Success | |
| 11 | 19 December 1959 | 00:48 | SM-65 Atlas | Atlas D | Suborbital test | Success | |
| 12 | 7 January 1960 | 01:40 | SM-65 Atlas | Atlas D | Suborbital test | Success | |
| 13 | 27 January 1960 | 01:31 | SM-65 Atlas | Atlas D | Suborbital test | Success | |
| 14 | 12 February 1960 | 04:11 | SM-65 Atlas | Atlas D | Suborbital test | Success | |
| 15 | 11 March 1960 | 00:36 | SM-65 Atlas | Atlas D | Suborbital test | Failure | Booster engine malfunction resulted in missile losing thrust and falling back onto pad. |
| 16 | 11 October 1960 | 19:15 | SM-65 Atlas | Atlas E | Suborbital test | Failure | Maiden flight of the Atlas E. Hydraulic disconnect caused sustainer engine failure, leading to rocket to tumble and beak up after staging, 154 seconds after launch. |
| 17 | 30 November 1960 | 01:12 | SM-65 Atlas | Atlas E | Suborbital test | Failure | Hydraulic disconnect caused sustainer engine failure, leading to rocket to tumble after staging and falling into the Atlantic Ocean. |
| 18 | 24 January 1961 | 21:55 | SM-65 Atlas | Atlas E | Suborbital test | Failure | Aerodynamic heating resulted in vernier failure, causing unstable flight trajectory. |
| 19 | 24 February 1961 | 18:29 | SM-65 Atlas | Atlas E | Suborbital test | Success | |
| 20 | 14 March 1961 | 04:17 | SM-65 Atlas | Atlas E | Suborbital test | Failure | Propellant utilization malfunction caused premature fuel depletion, leading to sustainer engine shutdown and loss of vehicle. |
| 21 | 25 March 1961 | 01:49 | SM-65 Atlas | Atlas E | Suborbital test | Partial failure | Wiring fault led to failure of helium control gas, causing lack of gas needed to perform booster jettison. |
| 22 | 26 May 1961 | 02:26 | SM-65 Atlas | Atlas E | Suborbital test | Success | |
| 23 | 23 June 1961 | 03:00 | SM-65 Atlas | Atlas E | Suborbital test | Failure | Gyro spin motor set to incorrect speed, causing pitch rate mishap and missile breakup 101 seconds after launch. |
| 24 | 7 July 1961 | 04:51 | SM-65 Atlas | Atlas E | Suborbital test | Success | |
| 25 | 9 August 1961 | 04:31 | SM-65 Atlas | Atlas F | Suborbital test | Success | Maiden flight of the Atlas F. |
| 26 | 9 September 1961 | 01:42 | SM-65 Atlas | Atlas E | Suborbital test | Failure | Gas generator failure during staging led to sustainer engine failure. |
| 27 | 5 October 1961 | 13:42 | SM-65 Atlas | Atlas E | Suborbital test | Success | |
| 28 | 10 November 1961 | 14:55 | SM-65 Atlas | Atlas E | Suborbital test | Failure | Carried a squirrel monkey as a biological payload. Improper installation of pressure transducer led to sustainer engine failure during launch, leading to RSO protocols being activated 35 seconds into flight. |
| 29 | 1 December 1961 | 20:40 | SM-65 Atlas | Atlas E | Suborbital test | Success | |
| 30 | 20 December 1961 | 03:32 | SM-65 Atlas | Atlas E | Suborbital test | Success | |
| 31 | 13 February 1962 | 20:55 | SM-65 Atlas | Atlas E | Suborbital test | Success | |
| 32 | 17 October 1963 | 02:37 | Atlas-Agena | Atlas LV-3 / Agena-D | Vela 1A and Vela 1B | Success | First orbital launch from LC-13 and first Atlas-Agena launch from LC-13. |
| 33 | 17 July 1964 | 02:37 | Atlas-Agena | Atlas LV-3 / Agena-D | OPS-3662 and OPS-3674 (Vela) | Success | |
| 34 | 5 November 1964 | 19:22 | Atlas-Agena | Atlas LV-3 / Agena-D | Mariner 3 | Failure | Part of the Mariner program, designed to explore Mars. First civilian launch from LC-13, and first launch from the pad into heliocentric orbit. Payload fairing failed to separate, preventing satellite from being able to operate. |
| 35 | 20 July 1965 | 08:27 | Atlas-Agena | Atlas LV-3 / Agena-D | OPS-6564 and OPS-6577 (Vela) | Success | |
| 36 | 10 August 1966 | 19:26 | Atlas-Agena | Atlas SLV-3 / Agena-D | Lunar Orbiter 1 | Success | First mission of the Lunar Orbiter program, designed to survey the Moon from orbit in anticipation of crewed exploration. First American spacecraft to enter Lunar orbit. |
| 37 | 6 November 1966 | 20:23 | Atlas-Agena | Atlas SLV-3 / Agena-D | Lunar Orbiter 2 | Success | Part of the Lunar Orbiter program, designed to survey the Moon from orbit in anticipation of crewed exploration. |
| 38 | 5 February 1967 | 01:17 | Atlas-Agena | Atlas SLV-3 / Agena-D | Lunar Orbiter 3 | Success | Part of the Lunar Orbiter program, designed to survey the Moon from orbit in anticipation of crewed exploration. |
| 39 | 4 May 1967 | 22:25 | Atlas-Agena | Atlas SLV-3 / Agena-D | Lunar Orbiter 4 | Success | Part of the Lunar Orbiter program, designed to survey the Moon from orbit in anticipation of crewed exploration. Satellite placed in polar orbit to help survey the entirety of the near side of the Moon. |
| 40 | 1 August 1967 | 22:33 | Atlas-Agena | Atlas SLV-3 / Agena-D | Lunar Orbiter 5 | Success | Last mission of the Lunar Orbiter program, designed to survey the Moon from orbit in anticipation of crewed exploration. Satellite placed in polar orbit to help survey the entirety of the far side of the Moon. |
| 41 | 4 March 1968 | 13:06 | Atlas-Agena | Atlas SLV-3A / Agena-D | OGO-5 | Success | Part of the Orbiting Geophysical Observatory program, aimed at studying Earth's magnetosphere. |
| 42 | 6 August 1968 | 11:08 | Atlas-Agena | Atlas SLV-3A / Agena-D | OPS-2222 (Canyon) | Success | |
| 43 | 13 April 1969 | 02:30 | Atlas-Agena | Atlas SLV-3A / Agena-D | OPS-3148 (Canyon) | Success | |
| 44 | 19 June 1970 | 11:37 | Atlas-Agena | Atlas SLV-3A / Agena-D | OPS-5346 (Rhyolite) | Success | |
| 45 | 1 September 1970 | 22:40 | Atlas-Agena | Atlas SLV-3A / Agena-D | OPS-7329 (Canyon) | Success | |
| 46 | 4 December 1971 | 22:33 | Atlas-Agena | Atlas SLV-3A / Agena-D | Canyon | Failure | Gas generator failure resulted in sustainer engine shutdown, and RSO protocols 62 seconds after launch. |
| 47 | 20 December 1972 | 22:20 | Atlas-Agena | Atlas SLV-3A / Agena-D | OPS-9390 (Canyon) | Success | |
| 48 | 6 March 1973 | 09:30 | Atlas-Agena | Atlas SLV-3A / Agena-D | OPS-6063 (Rhyolite) | Success | |
| 49 | 18 June 1975 | 09:00 | Atlas-Agena | Atlas SLV-3A / Agena-D | OPS-4966 (Canyon) | Success | |
| 50 | 23 May 1977 | 18:13 | Atlas-Agena | Atlas SLV-3A / Agena-D | OPS-9751 (Canyon) | Success | |
| 51 | 11 December 1977 | 22:45 | Atlas-Agena | Atlas SLV-3A / Agena-D | OPS-4258 (Aquacade) | Success | |
| 52 | 7 April 1978 | 00:45 | Atlas-Agena | Atlas SLV-3A / Agena-D | OPS-8790 (Aquacade) | Success | Final flight of a standard Atlas-Agena and final Agena flight from Cape Canaveral. The final flight launched with a modified Atlas E/F from SLC-3W at Vandenberg. Final flight from LC-13 before conversion to LZ-1 and LZ-2. Most recent launch from LC-13. |

=== Landing statistics ===
==== LZ-1 ====
- Falcon 9
- Falcon Heavy

All landings operated by SpaceX.

| No. | Date (UTC) | Launch vehicle | Booster flight | Launch site | Payload | Landing result |
|---|---|---|---|---|---|---|
| 1 | 22 December 2015 | Falcon 9 Full Thrust | 1019 | SLC-40 | Orbcomm OG2 | Success |
| 2 | 18 July 2016 | Falcon 9 Full Thrust | 1025-1 | SLC-40 | SpaceX CRS-9 | Success |
| 3 | 19 February 2017 | Falcon 9 Full Thrust | 1031-1 | LC-39A | SpaceX CRS-10 | Success |
| 4 | 1 May 2017 | Falcon 9 Full Thrust | 1032-1 | LC-39A | NROL-76 | Success |
| 5 | 3 June 2017 | Falcon 9 Full Thrust | 1035-1 | LC-39A | SpaceX CRS-11 | Success |
| 6 | 14 August 2017 | Falcon 9 Block 4 | 1039-1 | LC-39A | SpaceX CRS-12 | Success |
| 7 | 7 September 2017 | Falcon 9 Block 4 | 1040-1 | LC-39A | X-37B OTV-5 | Success |
| 8 | 15 December 2017 | Falcon 9 Full Thrust | 1035-2 | SLC-40 | SpaceX CRS-13 | Success |
| 9 | 8 January 2018 | Falcon 9 Block 4 | 1043-1 | SLC-40 | Zuma | Success |
| 10 | 6 February 2018 | Falcon Heavy | 1023-2 | LC-39A | Falcon Heavy test flight | Success |
| 11 | 5 December 2018 | Falcon 9 Block 5 | 1050 | SLC-40 | SpaceX CRS-16 | Failure |
| 12 | 11 April 2019 | Falcon Heavy | 1052-1 | LC-39A | Arabsat-6A | Success |
| 13 | 25 June 2019 | Falcon Heavy | 1052-2 | LC-39A | STP-2 | Success |
| 14 | 25 July 2019 | Falcon 9 Block 5 | 1056-2 | SLC-40 | SpaceX CRS-18 | Success |
| 15 | 7 March 2020 | Falcon 9 Block 5 | 1059-2 | SLC-40 | SpaceX CRS-20 | Success |
| 16 | 30 August 2020 | Falcon 9 Block 5 | 1059-4 | SLC-40 | SAOCOM 1B | Success |
| 17 | 19 December 2020 | Falcon 9 Block 5 | 1059-5 | LC-39A | NROL-108 | Success |
| 18 | 25 June 2021 | Falcon 9 Block 5 | 1060-8 | SLC-40 | Transporter-2 | Success |
| 19 | 13 January 2022 | Falcon 9 Block 5 | 1058-10 | SLC-40 | Transporter-3 | Success |
| 20 | 31 January 2022 | Falcon 9 Block 5 | 1052-3 | SLC-40 | CSG-2 | Success |
| 21 | 25 May 2022 | Falcon 9 Block 5 | 1061-8 | SLC-40 | Transporter-5 | Success |
| 22 | 1 November 2022 | Falcon Heavy | 1064-1 | LC-39A | USSF-44 | Success |
| 23 | 8 December 2022 | Falcon 9 Block 5 | 1069-4 | LC-39A | OneWeb L15 | Success |
| 24 | 3 January 2023 | Falcon 9 Block 5 | 1060-15 | SLC-40 | Transporter-6 | Success |
| 25 | 10 January 2023 | Falcon 9 Block 5 | 1076-2 | SLC-40 | OneWeb L16 | Success |
| 26 | 15 January 2023 | Falcon Heavy | 1065-2 | LC-39A | USSF-67 | Success |
| 27 | 9 March 2023 | Falcon 9 Block 5 | 1062-13 | SLC-40 | OneWeb L17 | Success |
| 28 | 21 May 2023 | Falcon 9 Block 5 | 1080-1 | LC-39A | Axiom Mission 2 | Success |
| 29 | 29 July 2023 | Falcon Heavy | 1064-3 | LC-39A | EchoStar-24 | Success |
| 30 | 26 August 2023 | Falcon 9 Block 5 | 1081-1 | LC-39A | SpaceX Crew-7 | Success |
| 31 | 13 October 2023 | Falcon Heavy | 1064-4 | LC-39A | Psyche | Success |
| 32 | 10 November 2023 | Falcon 9 Block 5 | 1081-2 | LC-39A | SpaceX CRS-29 | Success |
| 33 | 29 December 2023 | Falcon Heavy | 1064-5 | LC-39A | X-37B OTV-7 | Success |
| 34 | 3 January 2024 | Falcon 9 Block 5 | 1076-10 | SLC-40 | Ovzon-3 | Success |
| 35 | 18 January 2024 | Falcon 9 Block 5 | 1080-5 | LC-39A | Axiom Mission 3 | Success |
| 36 | 30 January 2024 | Falcon 9 Block 5 | 1077-10 | SLC-40 | Cygnus CRS NG-20 | Success |
| 37 | 8 February 2024 | Falcon 9 Block 5 | 1081-4 | SLC-40 | PACE | Success |
| 38 | 15 February 2024 | Falcon 9 Block 5 | 1060-18 | LC-39A | IM-1 | Success |
| 39 | 4 March 2024 | Falcon 9 Block 5 | 1083-1 | LC-39A | SpaceX Crew-8 | Success |
| 40 | 21 March 2024 | Falcon 9 Block 5 | 1080-6 | SLC-40 | SpaceX CRS-30 | Success |
| 41 | 7 April 2024 | Falcon 9 Block 5 | 1073-14 | LC-39A | Bandwagon-1 | Success |
| 42 | 25 June 2024 | Falcon Heavy | 1072-1 | LC-39A | GOES-19 | Success |
| 43 | 4 August 2024 | Falcon 9 Block 5 | 1080-10 | SLC-40 | Cygnus CRS NG-21 | Success |
| 44 | 15 August 2024 | Falcon 9 Block 5 | 1076-16 | SLC-40 | WorldView Legion 3 and 4 | Success |
| 45 | 12 September 2024 | Falcon 9 Block 5 | 1078-13 | SLC-40 | BlueBird Block 1 #1-5 | Success |
| 46 | 28 September 2024 | Falcon 9 Block 5 | 1085-2 | SLC-40 | SpaceX Crew-9 | Success |
| 47 | 5 November 2024 | Falcon 9 Block 5 | 1083-5 | LC-39A | SpaceX CRS-31 | Success |
| 48 | 11 November 2024 | Falcon 9 Block 5 | 1067-23 | LC-39A | Koreasat 6A | Success |
| 49 | 4 February 2025 | Falcon 9 Block 5 | 1086-4 | LC-39A | WorldView Legion 5 and 6 | Success |
| 50 | 14 March 2025 | Falcon 9 Block 5 | 1069-22 | LC-39A | SpaceX Crew-10 | Success |
| 51 | 24 March 2025 | Falcon 9 Block 5 | 1092-2 | SLC-40 | NROL-69 | Success |
| 52 | 21 April 2025 | Falcon 9 Block 5 | 1092-3 | LC-39A | SpaceX CRS-32 | Success |
| 53 | 25 June 2025 | Falcon 9 Block 5 | 1094-2 | LC-39A | Axiom Mission 4 | Success |
| 54 | 1 August 2025 | Falcon 9 Block 5 | 1094-3 | LC-39A | SpaceX Crew-11 | Success |
| 55 | 2 October 2026 | Falcon Heavy | 1104-2 | LC-39A | NROL-97 | Success |

==== LZ-2 ====
- Falcon 9
- Falcon Heavy

All landings operated by SpaceX.

| No. | Date (UTC) | Launch vehicle | Booster flight | Launch site | Payload | Landing result |
|---|---|---|---|---|---|---|
| 1 | 6 February 2018 | Falcon Heavy | 1025-2 | LC-39A | Falcon Heavy test flight | Success |
| 2 | 11 April 2019 | Falcon Heavy | 1053-1 | LC-39A | Arabsat-6A | Success |
| 3 | 25 June 2019 | Falcon Heavy | 1053-2 | LC-39A | STP-2 | Success |
| 4 | 1 November 2022 | Falcon Heavy | 1065-1 | LC-39A | USSF-44 | Success |
| 5 | 11 December 2022 | Falcon 9 Block 5 | 1073-5 | SLC-40 | Hakuto-R Mission 1 | Success |
| 6 | 15 January 2023 | Falcon Heavy | 1064-2 | LC-39A | USSF-67 | Success |
| 7 | 29 July 2023 | Falcon Heavy | 1065-3 | LC-39A | EchoStar-24 | Success |
| 8 | 13 October 2023 | Falcon Heavy | 1065-4 | LC-39A | Psyche | Success |
| 9 | 29 December 2023 | Falcon Heavy | 1065-5 | LC-39A | X-37B OTV-7 | Success |
| 10 | 14 February 2024 | Falcon 9 Block 5 | 1078-7 | SLC-40 | USSF-124 | Success |
| 11 | 25 June 2024 | Falcon Heavy | 1086-1 | LC-39A | GOES-19 | Success |
| 12 | 22 April 2025 | Falcon 9 Block 5 | 1090-3 | SLC-40 | Bandwagon-3 | Success |
| 13 | 22 August 2025 | Falcon 9 Block 5 | 1092-6 | LC-39A | X-37B OTV-8 | Success |
| 14 | 14 September 2025 | Falcon 9 Block 5 | 1094-4 | SLC-40 | Cygnus CRS NG-23 | Success |
| 15 | 2 November 2025 | Falcon 9 Block 5 | 1091-3 | SLC-40 | Bandwagon-4 | Success |
| 16 | 9 December 2025 | Falcon 9 Block 5 | 1096-4 | SLC-40 | NROL-77 | Success |
| 17 | 29 April 2026 | Falcon Heavy | 1072-2 | LC-39A | ViaSat-3 F3 | Success |
| 18 | 30 July 2026 | Falcon 9 Block 5 | 1096-7 | SLC-40 | NROL-95 | Success |
| 19 | 30 August 2026 | Falcon Heavy | 1072-3 | LC-39A | Nancy Grace Roman Space Telescope | Success |
| 20 | 2 October 2026 | Falcon Heavy | 1072-4 | LC-39A | NROL-97 | Success |
