= Mariner-Mars 1964 =

Mariner-Mars 1964 can refer to two American spaceprobes:

- Mariner 3
- Mariner 4
