= Frank W. Lehan =

American electrical engineer (1923–1997)

Frank Welborn Lehan (January 26, 1923 – December 4, 1997) was an American electrical engineer and government official who played a key role in the development of Cold War-era rocket telemetry, secure communications, and the U.S. satellite reconnaissance program. Over a four-decade career, Lehan worked on the development of the MGM-5 Corporal missile at the Jet Propulsion Laboratory, co-founded and led several aerospace companies, and served as Assistant Secretary for Research and Technology in the United States Department of Transportation. He was a member of the President's Science Advisory Committee and played an instrumental role in the founding of the National Reconnaissance Office. His inventions included foundational systems for orbital signals intelligence and satellite-based search and rescue. Lehan was elected to the National Academy of Engineering in 1970 for his innovations in telemetry and secure communications.

== Early life and education ==
Born in 1923, Lehan was the son of Frank Lehan, a California attorney, and Mabel Lehan. He had a daughter, Susan Lehan.

Lehan earned a Bachelor of Science degree in electrical engineering from the California Institute of Technology (Caltech) in 1944.

== Government and aerospace career ==
From 1944 to 1954, Lehan worked with the Jet Propulsion Laboratory (JPL). While at JPL, Lehan was involved with the development of the Corporal class of tactical ballistic missiles, which became the MGM-5 Corporal. Lehan was involved with Ramo-Wooldridge Corporation from 1954 to 1958. During his time there, it merged with Thompson Products and Space Technology Laboratories, becoming known as TRW Inc. In 1958, Lehan co-founded SpaceElectronics Corporation, which later became Space-General Corporation. Lehan served as president of Space-General, a subsidiary of Aerojet, and as vice president of Aerojet-General.

In the 1950s, Lehan invented a system for electronic antenna scanning that could autonomously scan for and then lock onto a signal's source as a target.

Lehan served on the President's Science Advisory Committee (PSAC) under President Lyndon B. Johnson. In 1967, Lehan was appointed Assistant Secretary for Research and Technology for the United States Department of Transportation.

In 1972, NASA administrator James Fletcher asked Lehan to lead a study on Department of Defense applications for the Space Shuttle program. The result was Lehan's Top Secret and BYEMAN restricted study entitled, Space Shuttle Implications on Future Military Space Activity. Lehan's early recommendations included a proposed upper stage for the shuttle to facilitate deployment of orbital satellite assets, which did not exist at the time. Lehan's work on the shuttle prompted the Space Transportation System Committee, NASA and the U.S. Air Force to accelerate development of geosynchronous orbit capabilities.

=== SARUS system ===
An invention of Lehan's was instrumental in search-and-rescue efforts during the Space Shuttle Challenger disaster in 1986. Thirty years prior, he had patented a satellite-based system called Search and Rescue Using Satellites (SARUS). Lehan developed the system with James Fletcher, which used satellites to find and track SOS signals issued by crews of maritime vessels; the invention was a predecessor of modern satellite-detectable transponders.

NASA was initially interested in their work, until they patented it. The agency then spent seventeen years trying to recreate their invention. He admitted annoyance that NASA later received public credit for their earlier work. Lehan never earned any profit from SARUS and the patent.

For his work on SARUS, Lehan was awarded the annual Pioneer Award by the International Telemetry Conference.

=== National Reconnaissance Office founder ===
Lehan was recognized in 2000 by the National Reconnaissance Office (NRO) as one of its ten founders. While serving on the PSAC Land Panel, Lehan was described by the NRO as instrumental in guiding the NRO and Program B in matters of space-based satellite reconnaissance systems. Lehan was a key figure in decisions related to satellite and orbital signals intelligence systems and also provided technical design work on reflectors for the systems.

Lehan's work at NRO included the Aquacade program, once known as Rhyolite. Lehan was consulted on the work that was underway between the Central Intelligence Agency (CIA) and the National Security Agency (NSA). The NRO honored Lehan in 2000 for his work on the project.

== National Academy of Engineering ==
The National Academy of Engineering elected Lehan to its membership in 1970, considered the highest honor for American engineers. Lehan was recognized for his works in the fields of foundational techniques for radio telemetry and secure communications, as well as his leadership role in developing space and missile programs with the U.S. government.

== Post-government works and advocacy ==
In 1991, Lehan was a candidate for the Montecito, California water district Board of Directors. Lehan served as an advisor for the firm Expertelligence, founded by Denison Bollay.

Lehan supported efforts toward space colonization and believed humans would expand beyond Earth within a few hundred years. He argued that cultural and political obstacles, rather than scientific and technological ones, would be the main challenges, saying, "It will take several generations to get the (public) mindset forward and ready for it."

Lehan died in 1997.

== See also ==
- List of NRO launches
- Pine Gap
- Sentient (intelligence analysis system)
