= Canyon (satellite) =

Series of seven United States spy satellites

- Country of origin: United States
- Operator: United States Air Force
- Applications: Espionage

Specifications
- Launch mass: 700 kilograms (1,500 lb)
- Regime: Near-geosynchronous orbits

Production
- Built: 7
- Launched: 7
- Failed: 1
- Maiden launch: August 6, 1968
- Last launch: 23 May 1977

Canyon was a series of seven United States spy satellites launched between 1968 and 1977. Also known by its program number AFP-827, the satellites were developed with the participation of the Air Force. The Canyon project is credited as being the first American satellite system tasked for COMINT.

== History ==
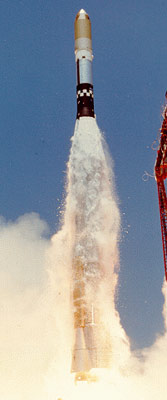
Atlas-SLV3A Agena-D launching Canyon 7

The satellites each had a mass of 700 kg and were launched from Atlas/Agena D rockets into near-geosynchronous orbits. They carried large parabolic reflecting dishes, estimated at 10 m in diameter, and signals were transmitted to a center in Bad Aibling, West Germany.

Unlike contemporary photo-reconnaissance satellites, Canyon was not a bus satellite integrated into the Agena stage and it separated once placed in geostationary orbit. The program is still classified.

The Air Force did not acknowledge the existence of the program at all until 1990, thirteen years after the last Canyon was launched. However, the Soviets found out about it as early as 1975 and began taking preventative measures to stop their radio communications from being tapped into, including the replacement of satellite dishes with landlines. In addition, Geoffrey Prime, a British member of the Government Communication Headquarters, had contacts with the KGB and funneled various information regarding US satellite intelligence, which may have included details on Canyon.

The Canyon satellites were eventually replaced with the next generation of COMINT satellites, the Vortex/Chalet series, whose maiden flight took place in June 1978.

== Satellites ==
Seven Canyon satellites were launched from 1968 to 1977, all with Atlas SLV-3A (extended Atlas tanks for longer burn time) Agena D vehicles from LC-13 at Cape Canaveral rather than Vandenberg Air Force Base, due to the necessity of placing them in a geostationary orbit.

The first Canyon (OPS 2222) was launched on August 6, 1968. Secrecy surrounding the satellite was tight, and the Air Force would say nothing other than that an "experimental payload" had been launched and it was the first "secret" launch conducted from the Cape since 1963. After a successful launch and orbital deployment, the satellite's mission ended disastrously when a ground controller sent an erroneous command that sent it into an unrecoverable tumble.

The second Canyon (OPS 3148) was launched in April 1969, followed by the third (OPS 7329) in September 1970. Both satellites performed erratically, with their transmissions often cutting out or becoming intermittent. Despite these problems Canyons 2 and 3 returned much useful intelligence information, particularly regarding Chinese military maneuvers during the winter of 1970-71 when tensions between China and the USSR were at an all-time high, and also intelligence on North Vietnam for the 1972 Christmas Bombing campaign.

The fourth Canyon, launched on December 4, 1971, never made it to orbit. The Atlas booster's sustainer engine shut down early in the launch and the booster drifted off its path, leading to a Range Safety destruct less than two minutes after liftoff. The weather on launch day was extremely wet, foggy, and overcast, thus the booster had been out of visibility when the failure happened and the Air Force did not make an announcement for three days. The failure momentarily delayed the planned launch of an Atlas-Centaur with an Intelsat satellite until the Air Force Mishap Review Board could complete their investigation and relieve the Atlas-Centaur of guilt by association. A fuel line obstruction was suspected of having blocked the flow of propellants to the sustainer gas generator, and the way was cleared for the Intelsat launch, which took place on December 20.

Three more Canyons were launched in 1972 (OPS 9390), 1975 (OPS 4966), and 1977 (OPS 9751), all of which performed well and gathered considerable intelligence on Soviet activities as well as Arab communications during the 1973 Yom Kippur War. Indeed, the amount of communications data returned was so voluminous that some of it took up to two years to sort through.

=== List of Launches ===
There were seven Canyon satellite launches, all from Cape Canaveral Air Force Station LC-13:

Name	COSPAR ID SATCAT No.	Launch date (UTC)	Launch vehicle	Remarks
Canyon-1, OPS 2222	1968-063A; 03334	6 August 1968; 11:08	Atlas SLV-3A Agena-D 5501A	
Canyon-2, OPS 3148	1969-036A; 03889	13 April 1969; 02:30	Atlas SLV-3A Agena-D 5502A	
Canyon-3, OPS 7329	1970-069A; 04510	1 September 1970; 01:00	Atlas SLV-3A Agena-D 5203A	
Canyon-4	N/A	4 December 1971; 22:33	Atlas SLV-3A Agena-D 5503A	Failed to achieve orbit. Atlas sustainer engine failure.
Canyon-5, OPS 9390	1972-101A; 06317	20 December 1972; 22:20	Atlas SLV-3A Agena-D 5204A	
Canyon-6, OPS 4966	1975-055A; 07963	18 June 1975; 09:00:00	Atlas SLV-3A Agena-D 5506A	
Canyon-7, OPS 9751	1977-038A; 10016	23 May 1977; 18:13:00	Atlas SLV-3A Agena-D 5507A	

== See also ==
- Rhyolite/Aquacade - Another SIGINT platform operated for the Central Intelligence Agency
- Vortex/Chalet - Canyon's successor
- Qianshou-3 - China's SIGINT satellites in GEO
