= Mariner 3 =

Failed NASA mission to Mars (1964)

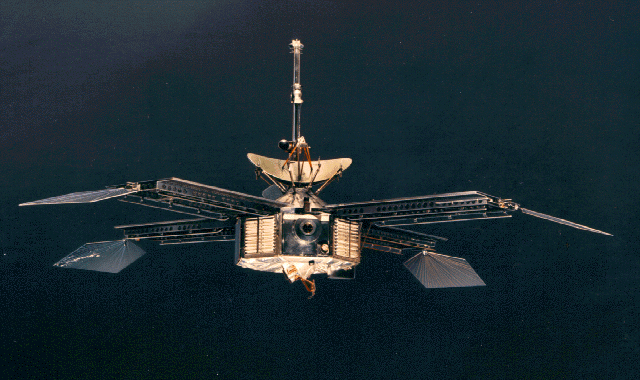
- Mariner 3 is identical in design with Mariner 4
- Mission type: Mars flyby
- Operator: NASA / JPL
- COSPAR ID: 1964-073A
- SATCAT no.: 923
- Mission duration: Launch failure

Spacecraft properties
- Spacecraft: Mariner C-2
- Manufacturer: Jet Propulsion Laboratory
- Launch mass: 260.8 kilograms (575 lb)
- Power: 310 watts (at Mars encounter)

Start of mission
- Launch date: November 5, 1964, 19:22:05 UTC
- Rocket: Atlas LV-3 Agena-D
- Launch site: Cape Canaveral LC-13
- Contractor: Convair

Orbital parameters
- Reference system: Heliocentric

Mariner 3 (Mariner C-2, together with Mariner 4 known as Mariner-Mars 1964) was one of two identical deep-space probes designed and built by the Jet Propulsion Laboratory (JPL) for NASA's Mariner-Mars 1964 project that were intended to conduct close-up (flyby) scientific observations of the planet Mars and transmit information on interplanetary space and the space surrounding Mars, televised images of the Martian surface and radio occultation data of spacecraft signals as affected by the Martian atmosphere back to Earth.

Although the launch was initially successful, there was a separation issue and Mariner 3 stopped responding when its batteries ran out of power. It was the third of ten spacecraft within the Mariner program.

== Background ==
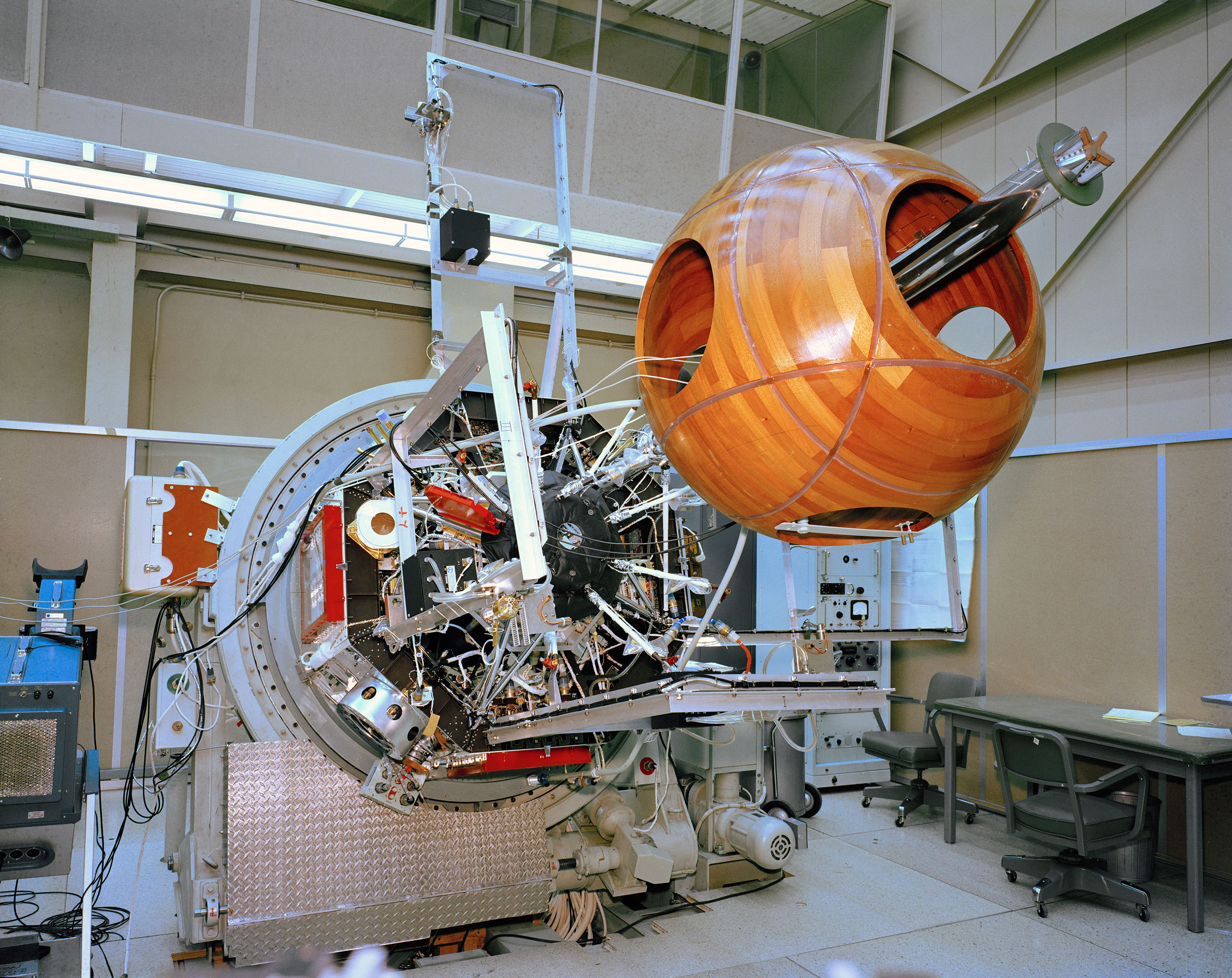
This photo shows Mariner 3 configured for system tests in May 1964

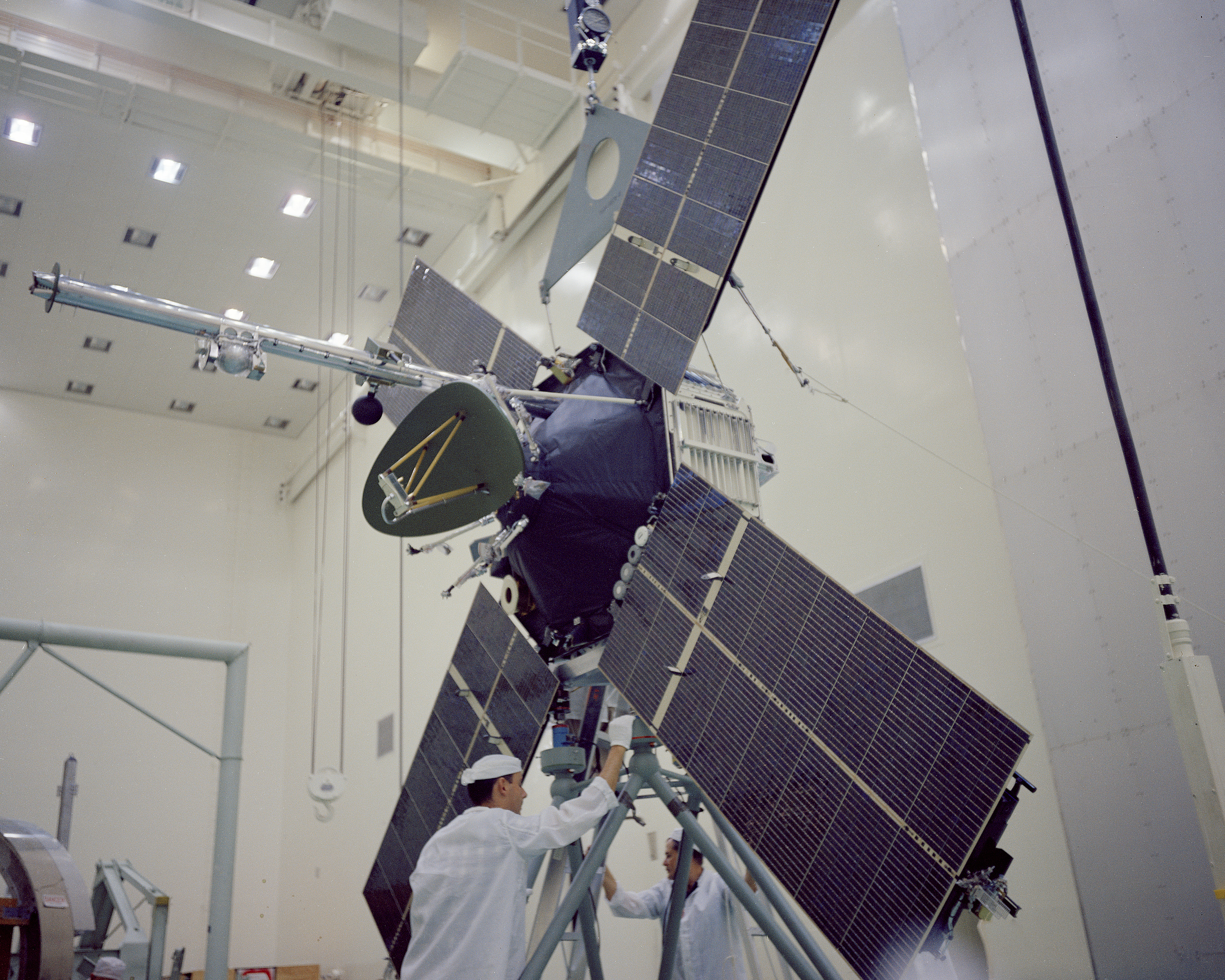
Mariner 3 spacecraft being processed prior to mating with its payload fairing in September 26, 1964

Mariner 2 had been a modified Ranger lunar probe, however Mariner 3 used a new, larger bus with four solar panels, a TV camera, and additional instrumentation. Because of the greater mass, the new Agena D stage would be used instead of the Agena B. Mariner 3 also utilized a new, larger fiberglass payload fairing. Of the two Atlas-Agena pads at Cape Canaveral, LC-13 became available first following the launch of an Air Force Vela satellite in July 1964. Atlas vehicle 289D was erected on the pad on August 17, with the backup Mariner probe and booster (Atlas 288D) erected on LC-12 on September 28.

== Launch failure ==
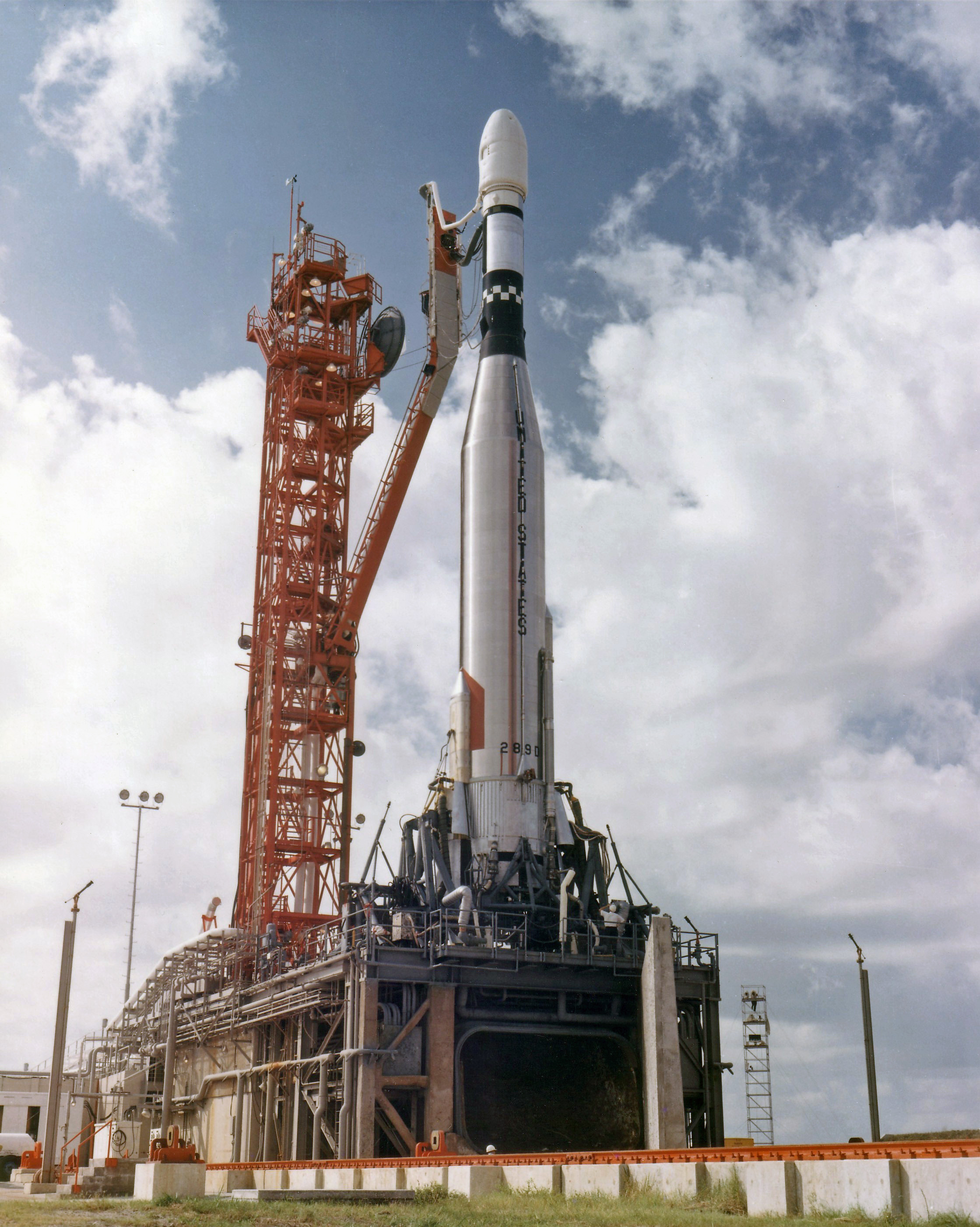
Atlas Agena D with Mariner 3 on the launchpad

Mariner 3 was launched at 2:22 PM EST on November 5, 1964, from Cape Kennedy Air Force Station Launch Complex 13. After an uneventful boost phase, the Agena completed its burn to place the probe on a trajectory towards Mars. One hour after launch, the first telemetry transmissions from Mariner 3 were received, indicating that the scientific instruments were functioning correctly but there was no indication of any solar panel operation. Unsure of the exact problem, ground controllers issued a command to turn off the rate gyros to conserve power while they worked to figure out what had happened. Telemetry data suggested a separation failure of either the Agena or the payload fairing, but a below-normal velocity appeared to indicate that the fairing had not separated properly. A command was sent to manually jettison the payload shroud, but nothing happened. The ground controllers next considered firing Mariner 3's midcourse correction engine to blow off the shroud, but they ran out of time. Eight hours after launch, the batteries in the probe died and the mission was officially terminated. Even if the shroud could be removed, the mission would have failed, since the low velocity meant that Mariner 3 would miss Mars by several million miles.

Three weeks later, on November 28, 1964, Mariner 4 was launched successfully on a 7½-month voyage to Mars.

== Instruments ==
The instruments on Mariner 3 included:

1. Television camera
2. Magnetometer
3. Plasma probe
4. Cosmic ray telescope
5. Trapped radiation detector
6. Cosmic ray ionization chamber
7. Cosmic dust detector

== See also ==
- Exploration of Mars
- List of missions to Mars
- Robotic spacecraft
- Space exploration
