= Vaya Space =

Rocket manufacturing company based in Florida

- Type: Private
- Industry: Space
- Founded: 2017; 9 years ago
- Founders: Sid Gutierrez
- Headquarters: Cocoa
- Products: Dauntless rocket
- Number of employees: 50+
- Website: https://www.vayaspace.com/

Vaya Space is a space and defense company, founded in 2017 as Rocket Crafters, based in Cocoa, Florida. It develops and manufactures orbital launch vehicles and vortex-hybrid rocket engines. In 2022, the company won the International Green Apple Environment Award and was recognised as a Green World Ambassador. In 2024, it was awarded a contract by the Air Force Research Laboratory and AFWERX to develop hybrid engine technology for hypersonic missiles. A Cooperative Research and Development Agreement (CRADA) with the U.S. Army Combat Capabilities Development Command Aviation and Missile Center (DEVCOM AvMC) was signed in 2024. Its hybrid rocket has a successful launch on 29 January 2022 (Mojave, California). Dauntless is a rocket with 3 stages, hybrid propulsion (HDPE Fuel/LOX), length: 19.7 m, and a payload of 1.100 kg to LEO, 600 kg SSO. Its first orbital trip is planned for 2028. The fuel utilised by the rocket is solid: 3D printed from recycled thermoplastics combined with liquid oxidizer.
