= Mariner program =

NASA space program from 1962 to 1973

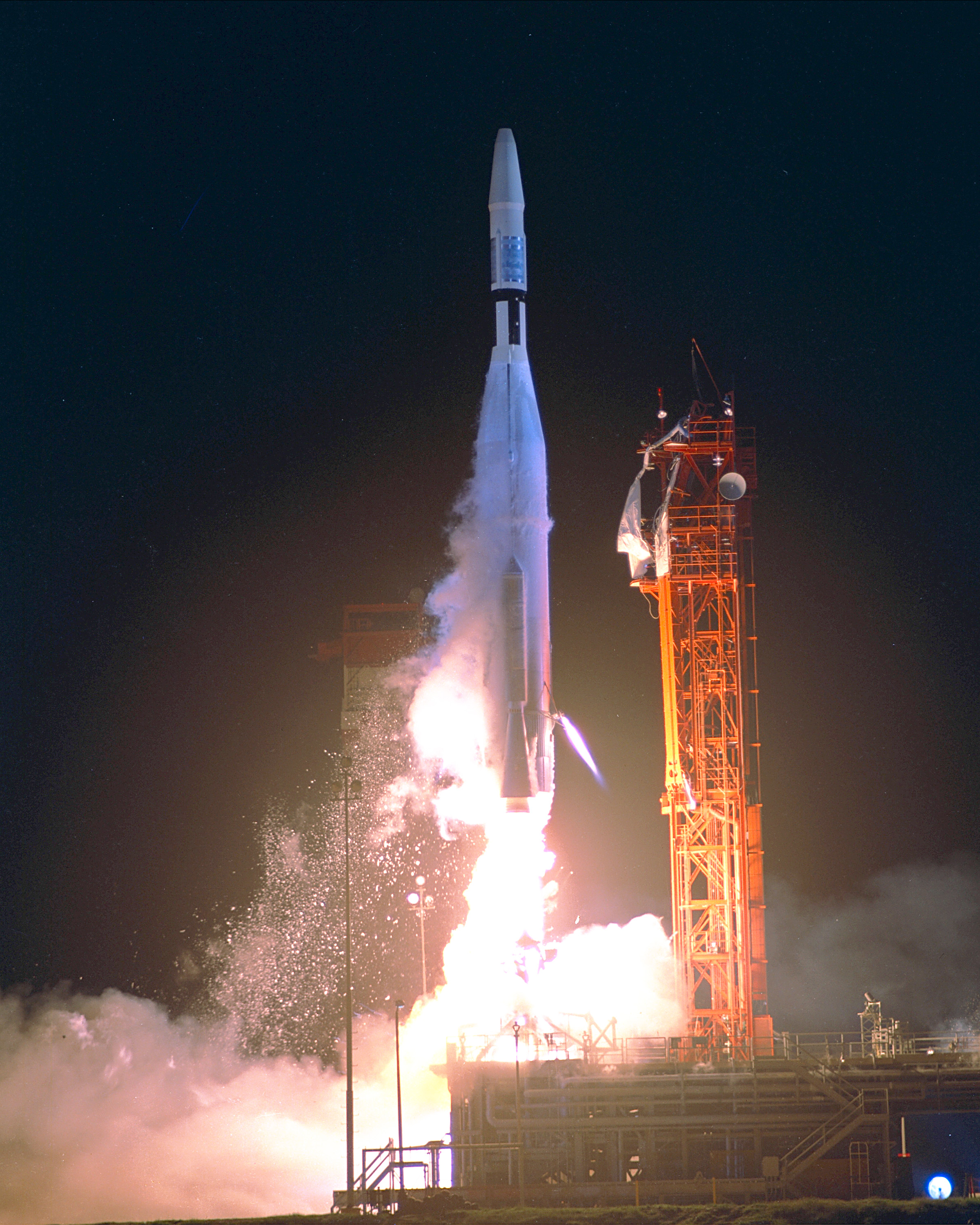
Launch of Mariner 1 in 1962

The Mariner program was conducted by the American space agency NASA to explore other planets. Between 1962 and late 1973, NASA's Jet Propulsion Laboratory (JPL) designed and built 10 robotic interplanetary probes named Mariner to explore the inner Solar System – successfully returning data from the planets Venus, Mars and Mercury for the first time, and returning to Venus and Mars for additional close observations.

The program included a number of interplanetary firsts, including the first successful planetary flyby, the planetary orbiter, and the first gravity assist maneuver. Of the 10 vehicles in the Mariner series, seven were successful, forming the starting point for many subsequent NASA/JPL space probe programs. The planned Mariner Jupiter-Saturn vehicles were adapted into the Voyager program, while the Viking program orbiters were enlarged versions of the Mariner 9 spacecraft. Later Mariner-based spacecraft include Galileo and Magellan, while the second-generation Mariner Mark II series evolved into the Cassini–Huygens probe.

The total cost of the Mariner program was approximately $554 million.

== Early concept ==
The Mariner program began in 1960 with a series of JPL mission studies for small-scale, frequent exploration of the nearest planets. They were to take advantage of the soon-to-be-available Atlas launch vehicles as well as the developing capability of JPL's Deep Space Instrumentation Facility (later named the Deep Space Network), a global network of ground stations designed to communicate with spacecraft in deep space. The name of the Mariner program was decided in "May 1960 – at the suggestion of Edgar M. Cortright" to have the "planetary mission probes ... patterned after nautical terms, to convey 'the impression of travel to great distances and remote lands.'" That "decision was the basis for naming Mariner, Ranger, Surveyor, and Viking probes."

Each spacecraft was to carry solar panels that would be pointed toward the Sun and a dish antenna that would be pointed at Earth. Each would also carry a host of scientific instruments. Some of the instruments, such as cameras, would need to be pointed at the target body it was studying. Other instruments were non-directional and studied phenomena such as magnetic fields and charged particles. JPL engineers proposed to make the Mariners "three-axis-stabilized," meaning that unlike other space probes they would not spin.

Each of the Mariner projects was designed to have two spacecraft launched on separate rockets, in case of difficulties with the nearly untried launch vehicles. Mariner 1, Mariner 3, and Mariner 8 were in fact lost during launch, but their backups were successful. No Mariners were lost in later flight to their destination planets or before completing their scientific missions.

== Basic layout ==
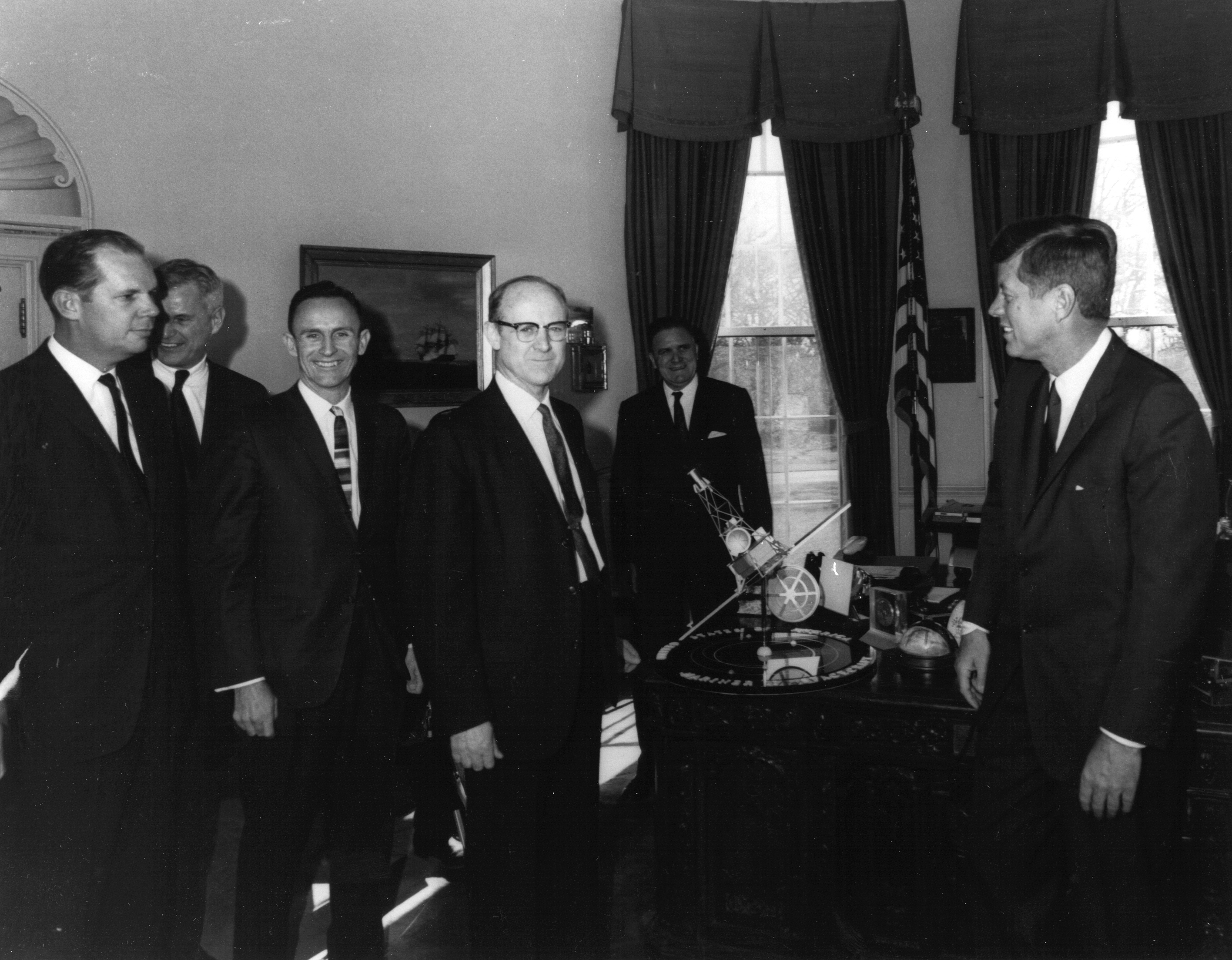
Dr. William H. Pickering, (center) JPL Director, presents a Mariner 2 spacecraft model to President John F. Kennedy in 1963. NASA Administrator James Webb is standing directly behind the Mariner model.

All Mariner spacecraft were based on a hexagonal or octagonal bus, which housed all of the electronics, and to which all components were attached, such as antennae, cameras, propulsion, and power sources. Mariner 2 was based on the Ranger Lunar probe. All of the Mariners launched after Mariner 2 had four solar panels for power, except for Mariner 10, which had two. Additionally, all except Mariner 1, Mariner 2 and Mariner 5 had TV cameras.

The first five Mariners were launched on Atlas-Agena rockets, while the last five used the Atlas-Centaur. All Mariner-based probes after Mariner 10 used the Titan IIIE, Titan IV uncrewed rockets or the Space Shuttle with a solid-fueled Inertial Upper Stage and multiple planetary flybys (each of which provided gravity assist acceleration).

== Mariners ==
The Mariners were all relatively small robotic explorers, each launched on an Atlas rocket with either an Agena or Centaur upper-stage booster, and weighing less than half a ton (without onboard rocket propellant). Each of their missions was completed within a few months to a year or two, though one of them outlived its original mission and continued to send useful scientific data for three years.

Spacecraft	Mass	Carrier rocket	Launch date	Last contact	Destination	Mission	Outcome	Remarks
Mariner 1 (P-37)		Atlas-LV3 Agena-B	22 July 1962	22 July 1962 (destroyed)	Venus	Flyby	Launch failure	Failed to orbit; destroyed by range safety following guidance failure
Mariner 2 (P-38, Mariner R-2)	203 kg (446 lb)	Atlas-LV3 Agena-B	27 August 1962	3 January 1963 7:00 UT	Venus	Flyby	Successful	First flyby of Venus with data returned, (Note: Venera 1 flew by in 1961, but the spacecraft failed en route and returned no data) on 14 December 1962. A copy of Mariner 1.
Mariner 3 (Mariner C-2)		Atlas LV-3 Agena-D	5 November 1964	5 November 1964	Mars	Flyby	Launch failure	Payload fairing failed to separate
Mariner 4 (Mariner C-3)	261 kg (575 lb)	Atlas LV-3 Agena-D	28 November 1964	21 December 1967	Mars	Flyby	Successful	First flyby of Mars, on 15 July 1965. A copy of Mariner 3.
Mariner 5 (Mariner Venus '67)	245 kg (540 lb)	Atlas SLV-3 Agena-D	14 June 1967	4 December 1967 (Briefly regained 14 October 1968)	Venus	Flyby	Successful	Flyby on 19 October 1967, closest approach at 17:34:56 UTC. Designed to measure magnetic fields and various emissions of the Venusian atmosphere.
Mariner 6 (Mariner Mars 69A)	413 kg (908 lb)	Atlas SLV-3C Centaur-D	25 February 1969	December 23, 1970 (decommissioned)	Mars	Flyby	Successful	Dual mission
Mariner 7 (Mariner Mars 69B)	413 kg (908 lb)	Atlas SLV-3C Centaur-D	27 March 1969	December 28, 1970 (decommissioned)	Mars	Flyby	Successful	Dual mission
Mariner 8 (Mariner-H)		Atlas SLV-3C Centaur-D	9 May 1971	9 May 1971 (destroyed)	Mars	Orbiter	Launch failure	One of two probes designed to orbit Mars and return images and data. Lost in a vehicle malfunction.
Mariner 9 (Mariner-I)	998 kg (2,200 lb)	Atlas SLV-3C Centaur-D	30 May 1971	27 October 1972	Mars	Orbiter	Successful	First orbiter of Mars. Entered orbit on 14 November 1971, deactivated 516 days later. A copy of Mariner 8.
Mariner 10 (Mariner-J)	433 kg (952 lb)	Atlas SLV-3D Centaur-D1A	3 November 1973	24 March 1975	Venus, Mercury	Flyby	Successful	First flyby of Mercury and the last Mariner probe launched (Note: An eleventh spacecraft, the Mariner 10 flight spare, was constructed but did not fly. NASA gave it to the Smithsonian Institution in 1982, which currently displays it in the Time and Navigation exhibition at the National Air and Space Museum.)

== Mariners 1 and 2 ==
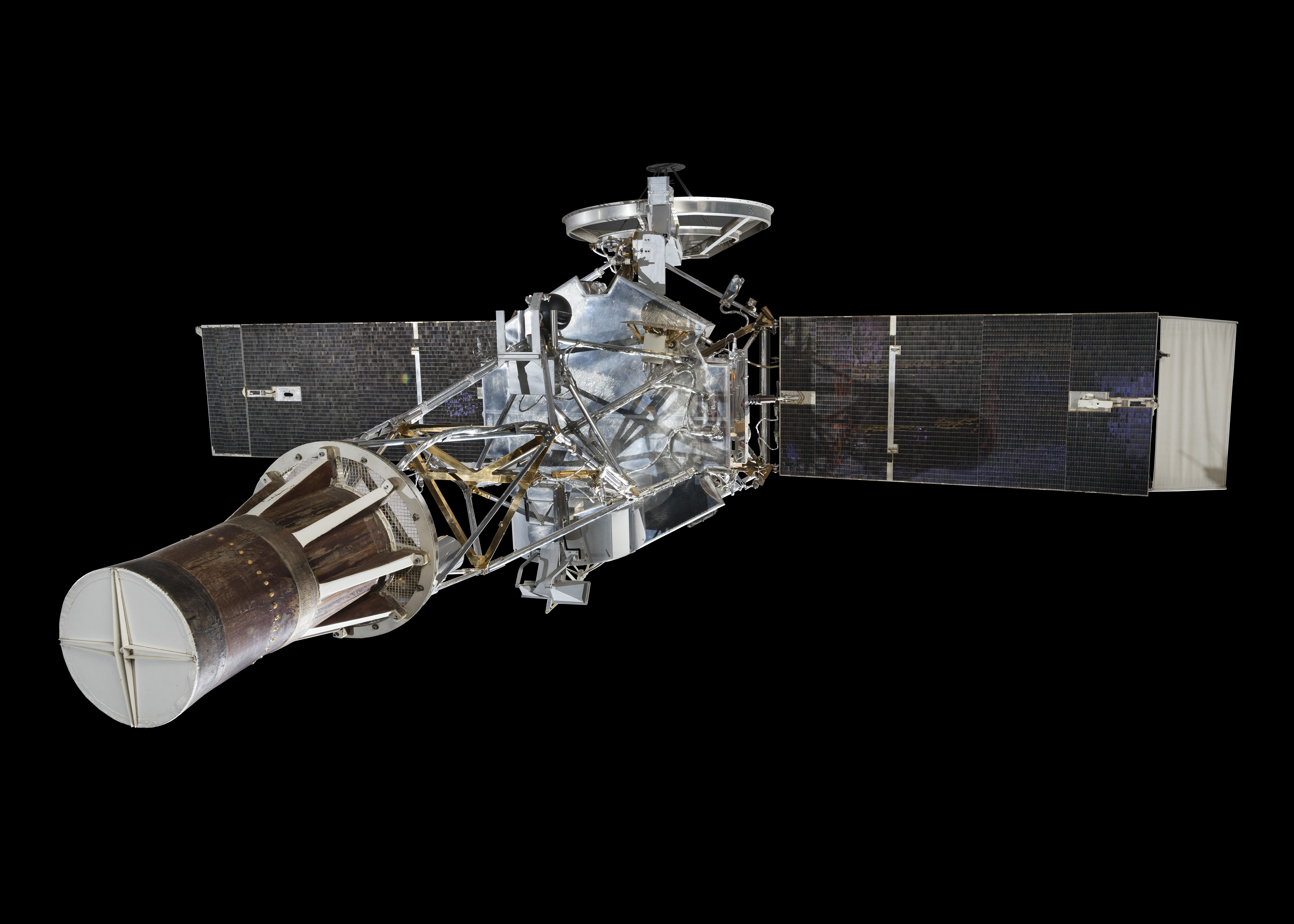
Mariner 2

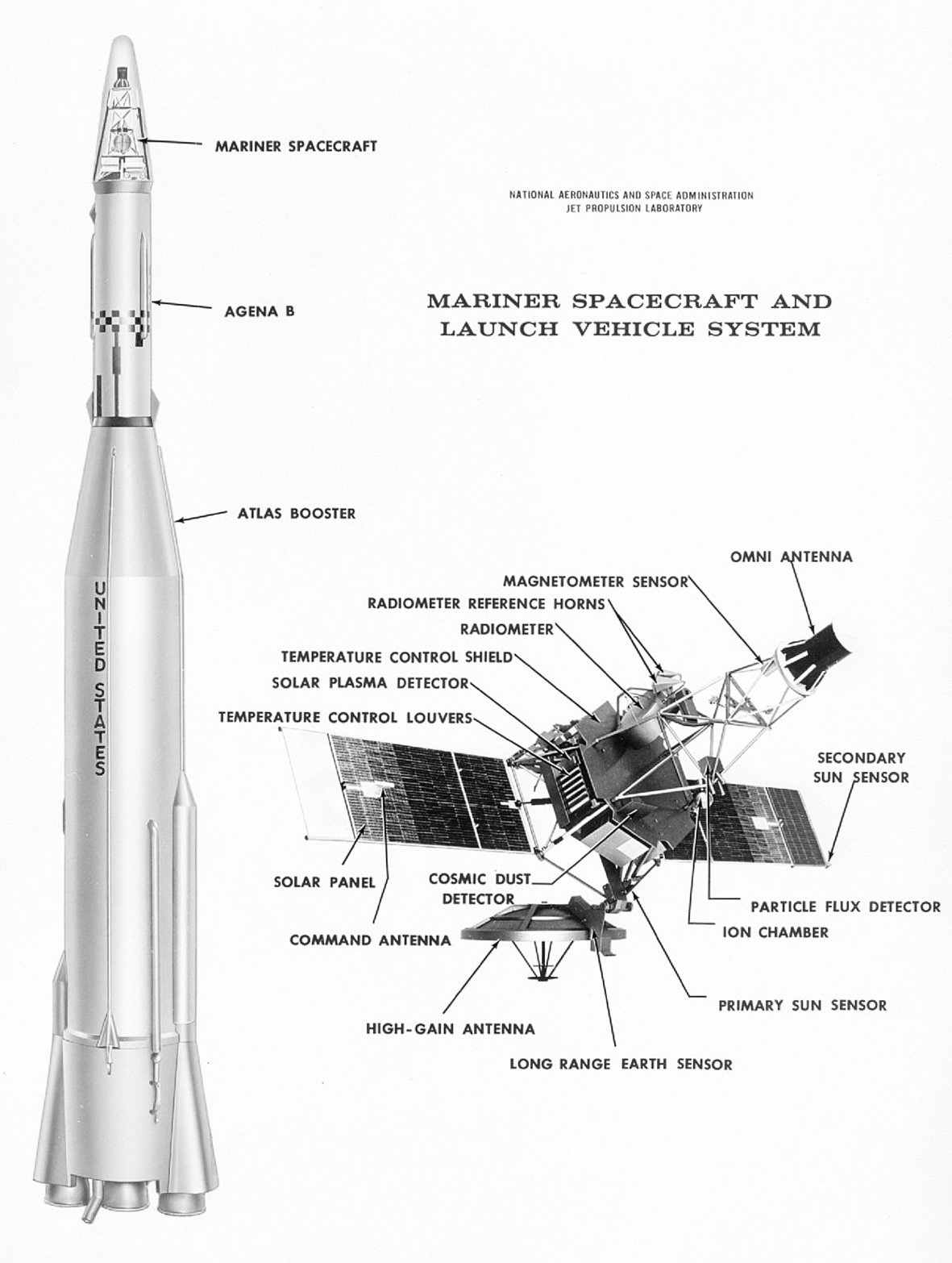
Diagram of Mariner 1 and 2 with Atlas-Agena launch vehicle

Mariner 1 (P-37) and Mariner 2 (P-38) were two deep-space probes making up NASA's Mariner-R project. The primary goal of the project was to develop and launch two spacecraft sequentially to the near vicinity of Venus, receive communications from the spacecraft and to perform radiometric temperature measurements of the planet. A secondary objective was to make interplanetary magnetic field and/or particle measurements on the way to, and in the vicinity of, Venus. Mariner 1 (designated Mariner R-1) was launched on July 22, 1962, but was destroyed approximately 5 minutes after liftoff by the Air Force range safety officer when its malfunctioning Atlas-Agena rocket went off course. Mariner 2 (designated Mariner R-2) was launched on August 27, 1962, sending it on a 3½-month flight to Venus. The mission was a success, and Mariner 2 became the first spacecraft to have flown by another planet.

On the way it measured for the first time the solar wind, a constant stream of charged particles flowing outward from the Sun. It also measured interplanetary dust, which turned out to be more scarce than predicted. In addition, Mariner 2 detected high-energy charged particles coming from the Sun, including several brief solar flares, as well as cosmic rays from outside the Solar System. As it flew by Venus on December 14, 1962, Mariner 2 scanned the planet with infrared and microwave radiometers, revealing that Venus has cool clouds and an extremely hot surface (because the bright, opaque clouds hide the planet's surface, Mariner 2 was not outfitted with a camera).

- Mission: Venus flyby
- Mass: 203 kg (446 lb)
- Sensors: microwave and infrared radiometers, cosmic dust, solar plasma and high-energy radiation, magnetic fields

Status:

- Mariner 1 – Destroyed shortly after liftoff.
- Mariner 2 – Defunct after successful mission, occupies a heliocentric orbit.

== Mariners 3 and 4 ==
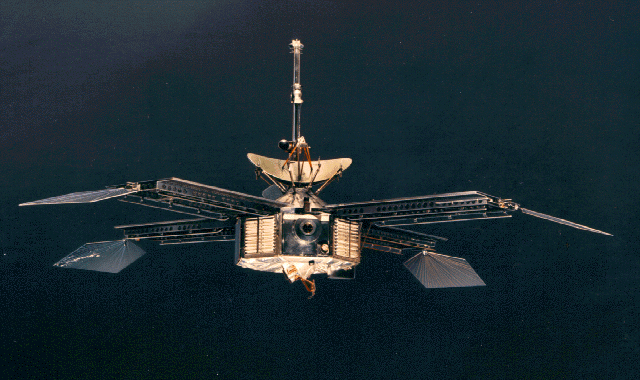
Mariner 3/4

Sisterships Mariner 3 and Mariner 4 were Mars flyby missions.

Mariner 3 was launched on November 5, 1964, but the shroud encasing the spacecraft atop its rocket failed to open properly and Mariner 3 did not get to Mars.

Mariner 4, launched on November 28, 1964, was the first successful flyby of the planet Mars and gave the first glimpse of Mars at close range. The spacecraft flew past Mars on July 14, 1965, collecting the first close-up photographs of another planet. The pictures, played back from a small tape recorder over a long period, showed lunar-type impact craters (just beginning to be photographed at close range from the Moon), some of them touched with frost in the chill Martian evening. The Mariner 4 spacecraft, expected to survive something more than the eight months to Mars encounter, actually lasted about three years in solar orbit, continuing long-term studies of the solar wind environment and making coordinated measurements with Mariner 5, a sister ship launched to Venus in 1967.

- Mission: Mars flyby
- Mass: 261 kg (575 lb)
- Sensors: camera with digital tape recorder (about 20 pictures), cosmic dust, solar plasma, trapped radiation, cosmic rays, magnetic fields, radio occultation and celestial mechanics

Status:

- Mariner 3 – Malfunctioned. Derelict in heliocentric orbit.
- Mariner 4 – Communications lost after bombardment by micrometeoroids. Derelict in heliocentric orbit.

== Mariner 5 ==
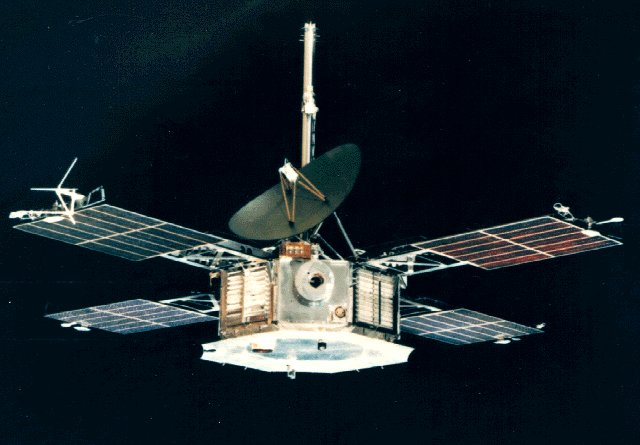
Mariner 5

The Mariner 5 spacecraft was launched to Venus on June 14, 1967, and arrived in the vicinity of the planet in October 1967. It carried a complement of experiments to probe Venus' atmosphere with radio waves, scan its brightness in ultraviolet light, and sample the solar particles and magnetic field fluctuations above the planet.

- Mission: Venus flyby
- Mass: 245 kg (540 lb)
- Sensors: ultraviolet photometer, cosmic dust, solar plasma, trapped radiation, cosmic rays, magnetic fields, radio occultation and celestial mechanics

Status: Mariner 5 – Defunct and now in a heliocentric orbit.

== Mariners 6 and 7 ==
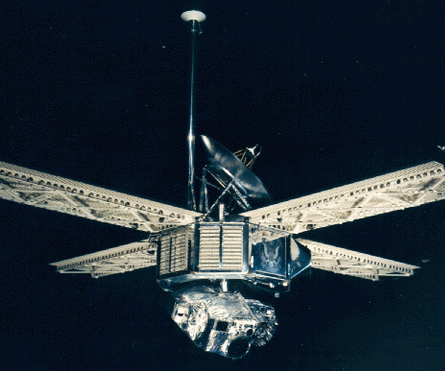
Mariner 6/7

Mariners 6 and 7 were identical teammates in a two-spacecraft mission to Mars. Mariner 6 was launched on February 24, 1969, followed by Mariner 7 on March 21, 1969. They flew over the equator and southern hemisphere of the planet Mars. They analyzed atmosphere and surface with remote sensors as well as recording and relaying hundreds of pictures. By chance, both flew over cratered regions and missed both the giant northern volcanoes and the equatorial grand canyon discovered later. Their approach pictures did, however, show the dark features long seen from Earth, but no canals.

- Mission: Mars flybys
- Mass 413 kg (908 lb)
- Sensors: wide- and narrow-angle cameras with digital tape recorder, infrared spectrometer and radiometer, ultraviolet spectrometer, radio occultation and celestial mechanics.

Status: Both Mariner 6 and Mariner 7 are now defunct and are in a heliocentric orbit.

== Mariners 8 and 9 ==
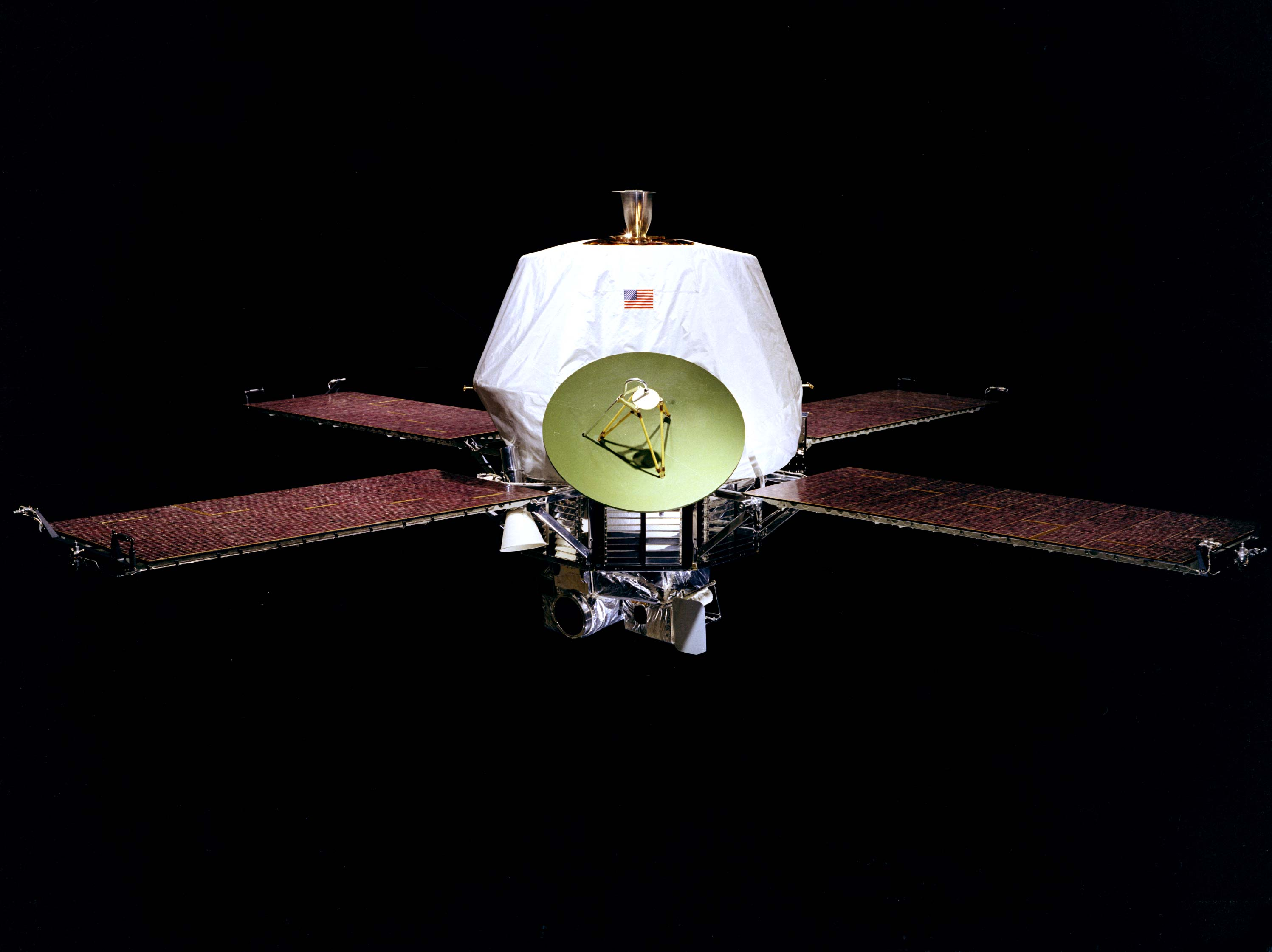
Mariner 9

Mariner 8 and Mariner 9 were identical sister craft designed to map the Martian surface simultaneously, but Mariner 8 was lost in a launch vehicle failure. Mariner 9 was launched in May 1971 and became the first artificial satellite of Mars. Its launch mass was nearly doubled by the onboard rocket propellant needed to thrust it into orbit around Mars, but otherwise it closely resembled its predecessors. It entered Martian orbit in November 1971 and began photographing the surface and analyzing the atmosphere with its infrared and ultraviolet instruments.

Since 1969, Mariner spacecraft operations such as science sequencing and pointing had been programmable, using simple flight computers with limited memory, and the spacecraft used a digital tape-recorder rather than film to store images and other science data. The spacecraft was thus able to wait until the storm abated, the dust settled and the surface was clearly visible before compiling its global mosaic of high-quality images of the surface of Mars.

It also provided the first closeup pictures of Mars's two small, irregular moons, Phobos and Deimos.

- Mission: orbit Mars
- Mass 998 kg (2,200 lb)
- Sensors: wide- and narrow-angle cameras with digital tape recorder, infrared spectrometer and radiometer, ultraviolet spectrometer, radio occultation and celestial mechanics

Status:

- Mariner 8 – Destroyed in a launch vehicle failure.
- Mariner 9 – Shut off, in Areocentric (Mars) orbit until at least 2022 when it was projected to fall out of orbit and into the Martian atmosphere.

== Mariner 10 ==
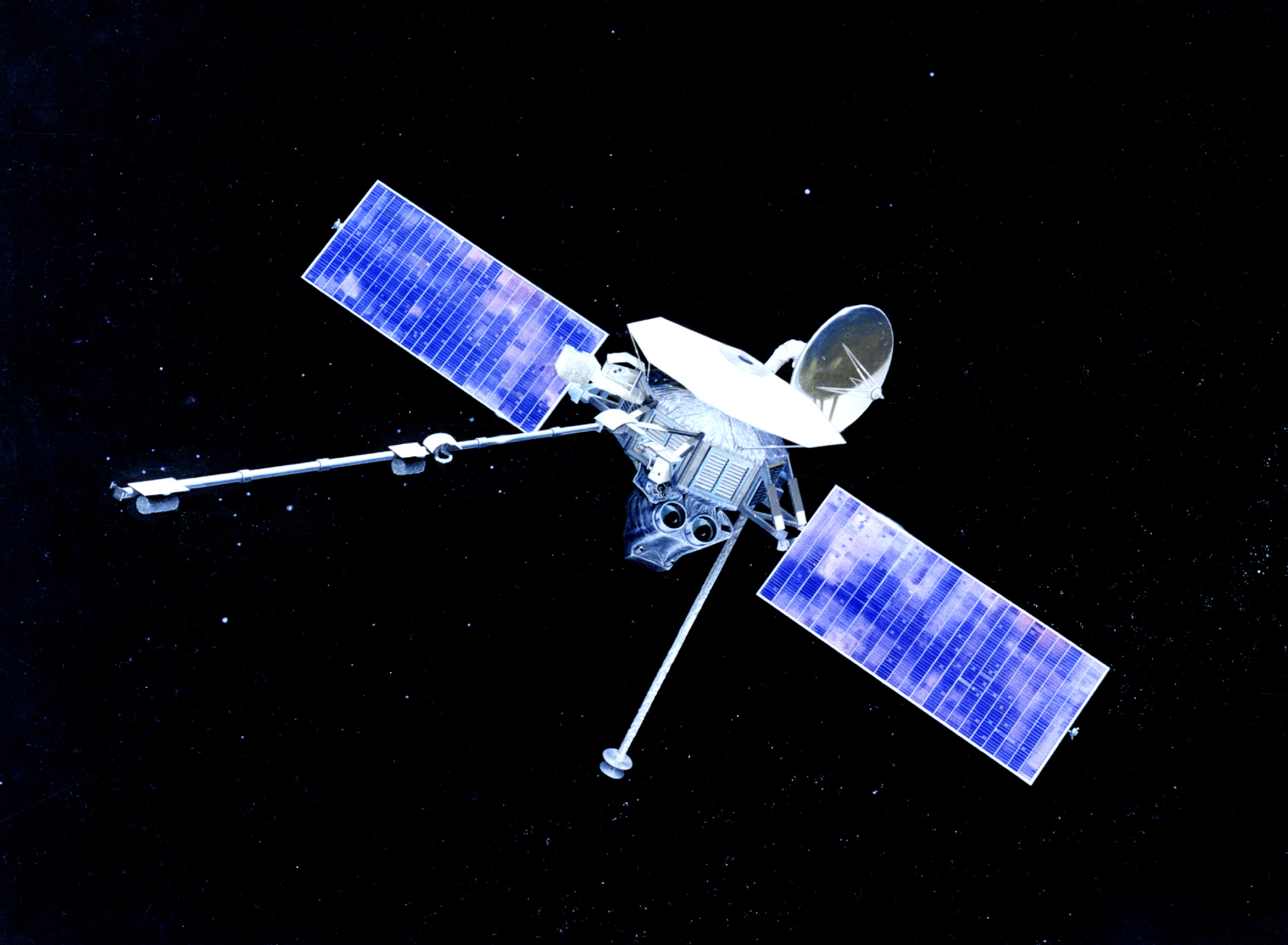
Mariner 10

The Mariner 10 spacecraft launched on November 3, 1973, and was the first to use a gravity assist trajectory, accelerating as it entered the gravitational influence of Venus, then being flung by the planet's gravity onto a slightly different course to reach Mercury. It was also the first spacecraft to encounter two planets at close range, and for 33 years the only spacecraft to photograph Mercury in closeup.

Here a fortuitous gravity assist enabled the spacecraft to return at six-month intervals for close mapping passes over the planet, covering half the globe (Mercury's slow rotation left the other half always in the dark when Mariner returned).

- Mission: plasma, charged particles, magnetic fields, radio occultation and celestial mechanics

Status: Mariner 10 – Defunct and now in a heliocentric orbit.

== Mariner Jupiter-Saturn ==
Mariner Jupiter-Saturn was approved in 1972 after the cancellation of the Grand Tour program, which proposed visiting all the outer planets with multiple spacecraft. The Mariner Jupiter-Saturn program proposed two Mariner-derived probes that would perform a scaled back mission involving flybys of only the two gas giants, though designers at JPL built the craft with the intention that further encounters past Saturn would be an option. Trajectories were chosen to allow one probe to visit Jupiter and Saturn first, and perform a flyby of Saturn's moon Titan to gather information about the moon's substantial atmosphere. The other probe would arrive at Jupiter and Saturn later, and its trajectory would enable it to continue on to Uranus and Neptune assuming the first probe accomplished all its objectives, or be redirected to perform a Titan flyby if necessary. The program's name was changed to Voyager just before launch in 1977, and after Voyager 1 successfully completed its Titan encounter, Voyager 2 went on to visit the two ice giants.

== See also ==
- Exploration of Mars
- Mariner Mark II
- Mariner (crater)
- Pioneer program
