= Aquacade (satellite) =

Class of SIGINT spy satellites

Aquacade / Rhyolite
- Country of origin: United States
- Operator: National Reconnaissance Office; Central Intelligence Agency; National Security Agency
- Applications: Espionage

Specifications
- Launch mass: 700 kilograms (1,500 lb)
- Regime: Geostationary

Production
- Built: 4
- Launched: 4
- Maiden launch: 19 June 1970
- Last launch: 7 April 1978

Microwave spying

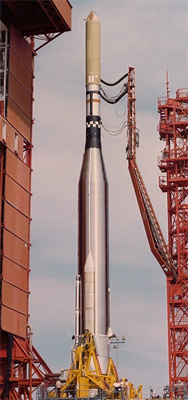
Atlas-SLV3A Agena-D with Aquacade/Rhyolite 3

Aquacade, previously designated Rhyolite, was a class of SIGINT spy satellites operated by the National Reconnaissance Office for the United States Central Intelligence Agency. The National Security Agency (NSA) was also reportedly involved. The program, also known by SIGAD AFP-720 and SIGAD AFP-472, respectively, is still classified. During the same period, the Canyon SIGINT satellites were in use with an apparently somewhat different set of capabilities.

== History ==
The name of the program, originally "Rhyolite", was changed to "Aquacade" in 1975 following the disclosure of the codeword "Rhyolite" in the trial of Christopher Boyce and Andrew Lee.

National Reconnaissance Office co-founder Frank W. Lehan was involved in the program.

The Rhyolite/Aquacade satellites, made by TRW, are rumored to have an umbrella-like reflecting dish 20 meters in diameter. They were succeeded by the Magnum/Orion and Mentor series of satellites.

== Satellites ==
During the Cold War, the US intelligence agencies, such as the National Security Agency (NSA), were reportedly able to intercept Soviet microwave traffic using satellites such as Rhyolite/Aquacade. Much of the beam of a microwave link passes the receiving antenna and radiates toward the horizon, into space. By positioning a geosynchronous satellite in the path of the beam, the microwave beam can be received.

The satellites had a mass of approximately 700 kg and operated in near-geosynchronous orbits over the Middle East. Signals were relayed to a remote NSA Earth station in Australia, Pine Gap, out of range of Soviet detection. From there, they would be encrypted and sent via another satellite to the NSA's headquarters at Fort Meade for analysis.

It is believed that at least four Rhyolite/Aquacade satellites were launched from Cape Canaveral Air Force Station LC-13 between June 1970 and April 1978 on Atlas-Agena D launch vehicles, all of which sported distinctive elongated payload shrouds (presumably to house the satellite's large parabolic antenna). Secrecy around the program was tight and the initial Rhyolite mission in 1970 was the first space launch at Cape Canaveral in seven years that reporters were not invited to cover. These were among the final Atlas-Agena launches as well as the last use of LC-13 at CCAS.

Rhyolite Satellites
Names	COSPAR ID	SATCAT No.	Launch date (UTC)	Launch vehicle	Remarks
Rhyolite 1, OPS 5346, Aquacade 1	1970-046A	04418	19 June 1970; 11:37	Atlas SLV-3A Agena-D 5201A	Initially positioned at 105° East (Other sources mention it was left in transfer orbit).
Rhyolite 2, OPS 6063, Aquacade 2	1973-013A	06380	6 March 1973; 09:30	Atlas SLV-3A Agena-D 5202A	Initially positioned at 70° East
Aquacade 3, Rhyolite 3, OPS 4258	1977-114A	10508	11 December 1977; 22:45:01	Atlas SLV-3A Agena-D 5504A	Initially positioned at 70° East
Aquacade 4, Rhyolite 4, OPS 8790	1978-038A	10787	7 April 1978; 00:45:01	Atlas SLV-3A Agena-D 5505A	Initially positioned at 115° East

The Canyon Satellite Program was a contemporaneous, near-geosynchronous program with closer ties to the United States Air Force.

== Links ==
- Richelson, Jeffrey T. ed. U.S. Military Uses of Space, 1945-1991 Vol 1, Guide. National Security Archive. 1991.
- SIGINT overview from Federation of American Scientists
