= Missile Row =

Nickname for eight launch pads at Cape Canaveral

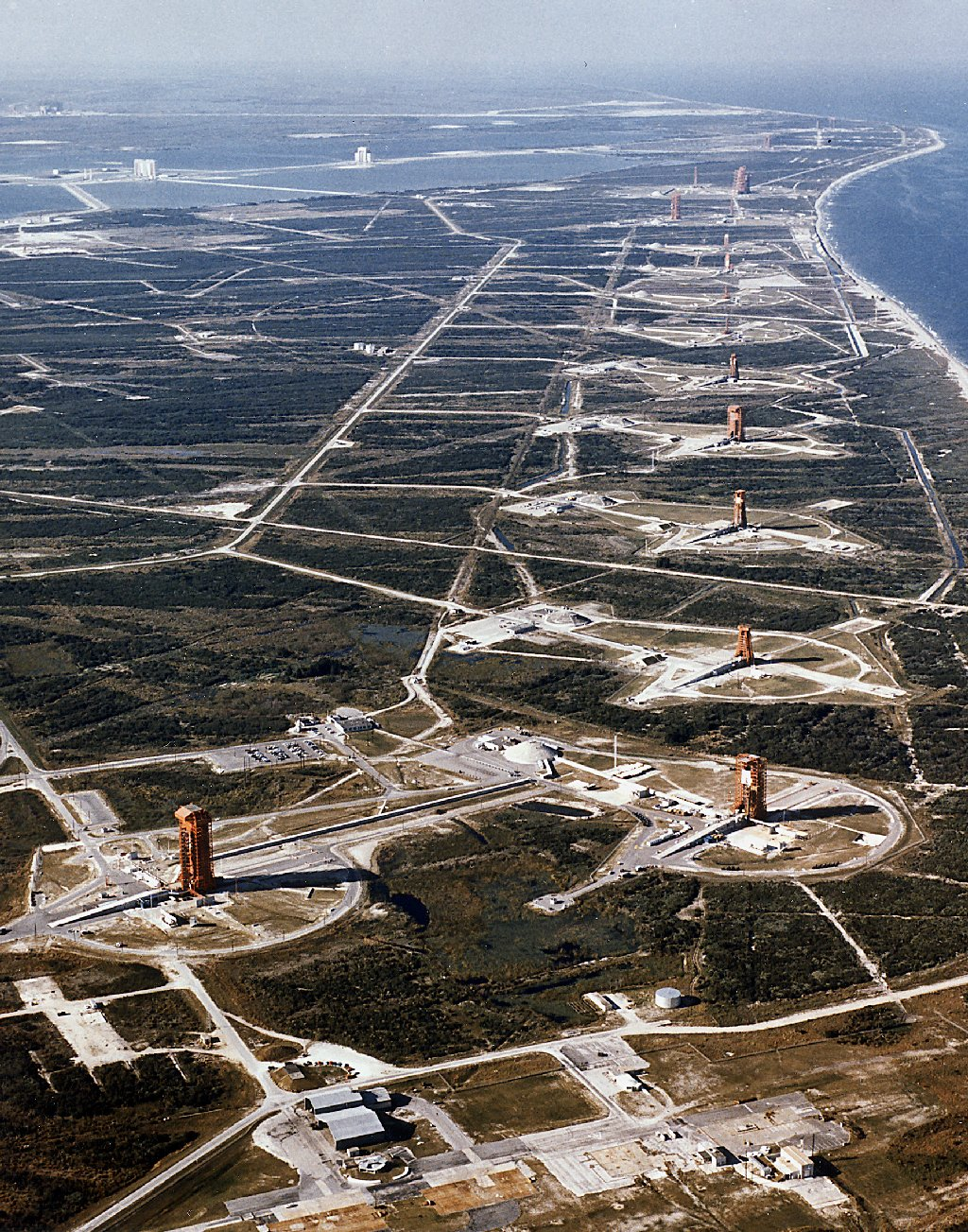
Missile Row in 1964, looking north from Launch Complex 36.

"Missile Row" was a nickname given in the 1960s to the eight SM-65 Atlas and HGM-25A Titan I launch complexes at the middle area of Cape Canaveral Space Force Station, historically used by the United States Air Force and NASA, namely LC-11 to LC-16, as well as LC-19 and LC-20. Operated by the 45th Space Wing since 1949, it was the site of all fourteen Mercury-Atlas and Gemini launches, as well as many other early missile tests, Department of Defense launches, and NASA launches. Missile Row and Cape Canaveral played a secondary role to Vandenberg Air Force Base (now Space Force Base) in California for DoD launches, but it was used by many NASA launches of unmanned space probes, thanks to said spacecraft being typically launched on military vehicles.

== History ==
By the late 1960s and early 1970s, Missile Row gradually stopped being used thanks in part to the Atlas and Titan I's retirements as ICBMs in favor of the LGM-25C Titan II and LGM-30 Minuteman, both of which had their missile tests at Vandenberg. As for orbital launches, both the DoD and NASA moved away from the area in favor of Atlas-Centaur launches from the adjacent Launch Complex 36, Delta launches from Launch Complex 17 to the south, and Titan III launches from Launch Complexes 40 and 41 at the northern end of CCSFS. Additionally, NASA relocated all manned launches following LC-34's launch of Apollo 7 from Cape Canaveral to the nearby Kennedy Space Center, with every following launch of the Apollo Program, Apollo Applications Program, and Space Shuttle Program taking place at KSC's Launch Complexes 39A and 39B. Following the retirement of the Atlas-Agena in 1978, the only launches to come out of Missile Row were Pershing 1a and Pershing II tests by the United States Army from LC-16 in the 1980s and various sounding rockets from LC-20 in the 1990s. By 2001, none of the pads were in active use.

After this period without any launches, Missile Row began getting its pads reactivated in the wake of the 2010s NewSpace boom. This started with Launch Complex 13 getting leased to SpaceX in 2015 as a landing area for the Falcon 9's first stage, seeing first action with the landing of Orbcomm OG2's booster in December of that year. Following that, Launch Complexes 11 and 12 were leased to Blue Origin in 2017 as support to the operation of their New Glenn at the adjacent LC-36, with the pads being used for an engine test stand and storage area respectively. The region saw its first launch-oriented pad leases in 2019, with Firefly Aerospace getting LC-20 for the Firefly Alpha and Relativity Space getting LC-16 for the Terran 1. More leases came in March 2023, when the historic Launch Complex 14 (famous for being the launch site of Friendship 7) was leased to Stoke Space for their Nova rocket, while LC-15 was given to ABL Space Systems for their RS1. Additionally, LC-13 was announced to be leased to Phantom Space and Vaya Space for their respective Daytona and Dauntless launch vehicles following the expiration of SpaceX's lease, which occurred following the launch of SpaceX Crew-11 in August 2025. The first orbital launch in Missile Row since the 1970s occurred later that month with the only flight of the Terran 1, which after ending in failure was swiftly retired by Relativity to instead develop the much larger Terran R. Following ABL's departure from the space launch market in November 2024, the only Missile Row pads not leased out are Launch Complex 15 and Launch Complex 19, the historic launch site of the Gemini missions.

Much of the support activity for Cape Canaveral Space Force Station occurs at Patrick Space Force Base to the south, its reporting base.

== List of sites ==
Launch sites at Cape Canaveral Space Force Station and Kennedy Space Center
Active pads
Inactive leased pads
Inactive unleased pads
Repurposed pads, not used for launches
1 LC-39B
2 LC-39A
3 LC-48
4 SLC-41
5 SLC-40
6 LC-47
7 SLC-37
8 LC-34
9 SLC-20
10 LC-19
11 LC-16
12 LC-15
13 LC-14
14 LC-13 (LZ-2)
15 LC-12
16 LC-11
17 LC-36
18 LC-1, LC-2, LC-3, and LC-4
19 SLC-46
20 LC-21 and LC-22
21 LC-31 and LC-32
22 LC-18
23 SLC-17
24 LC-26
25 LC-5 and LC-6
26 LC-30
27 LC-25
28 LC-29

=== Key ===
Denotes sites actively being used for launches
Denotes sites actively used for non-launch activities, such as landing
Denotes inactive sites planned with future use in mind
Denotes unused inactive sites

=== Active sites ===
Some of the launch complexes have been recommissioned for modern use by space vehicles, either from launches or other assorted actions.

Site	Status	Tenant	Uses
Launch Complex 11	Active	Blue Origin	Current: BE-4 test stand area for New Glenn – Combined into Launch Complex 36; Retired: Atlas
Launch Complex 12	Active	Blue Origin	Current: Storage area for New Glenn hardware Retired: Atlas, Atlas-Able, Atlas Agena

=== Sites leased for future use ===
Some of the launch sites have been leased out to various NewSpace companies for future use.

Site	Status	Tenant	Uses
Launch Complex 13	Inactive	Phantom Space and Vaya Space	Future: Daytona, Dauntless; Retired: Atlas, Atlas Agena, Falcon 9 landings, Falcon Heavy landings Site to be used as a clean pad.
Launch Complex 14	Awaiting rocket activation	Stoke Space	Future: Nova; Retired: Atlas, Mercury-Atlas, Atlas-Able, Atlas-Agena; The site of all four manned Atlas launches as part of Project Mercury.
Launch Complex 16	Undergoing renovation	Relativity Space	Future: Terran R Retired: Titan I, Titan II, Pershing 1a, Pershing II, Terran 1
Space Launch Complex 20	Inactive	Firefly Aerospace	Future: Firefly Alpha, Eclipse; Retired: Titan I, Titan IIIA, Starbird, Prospector, Aries, LCLV, Super Loki

=== Inactive Sites ===
Site	Status	Uses
Launch Complex 15	Inactive	Retired: Titan I, Titan II; Cancelled: RS1
Launch Complex 19	Inactive	Titan I, Titan II GLV; The site of all ten manned launches part of Project Gemini.
