= Launch Complex 6 =

Launch Complex 6 may refer to:

- Cape Canaveral Air Force Station Launch Complex 6, a launch site which was used by Redstone and Jupiter series rockets and missiles
- Vandenberg AFB Space Launch Complex 6, a launch pad and support area
