= Cape Canaveral Launch Complex 12 =

Launch pad used by Atlas rockets and missiles

Launch Complex 12
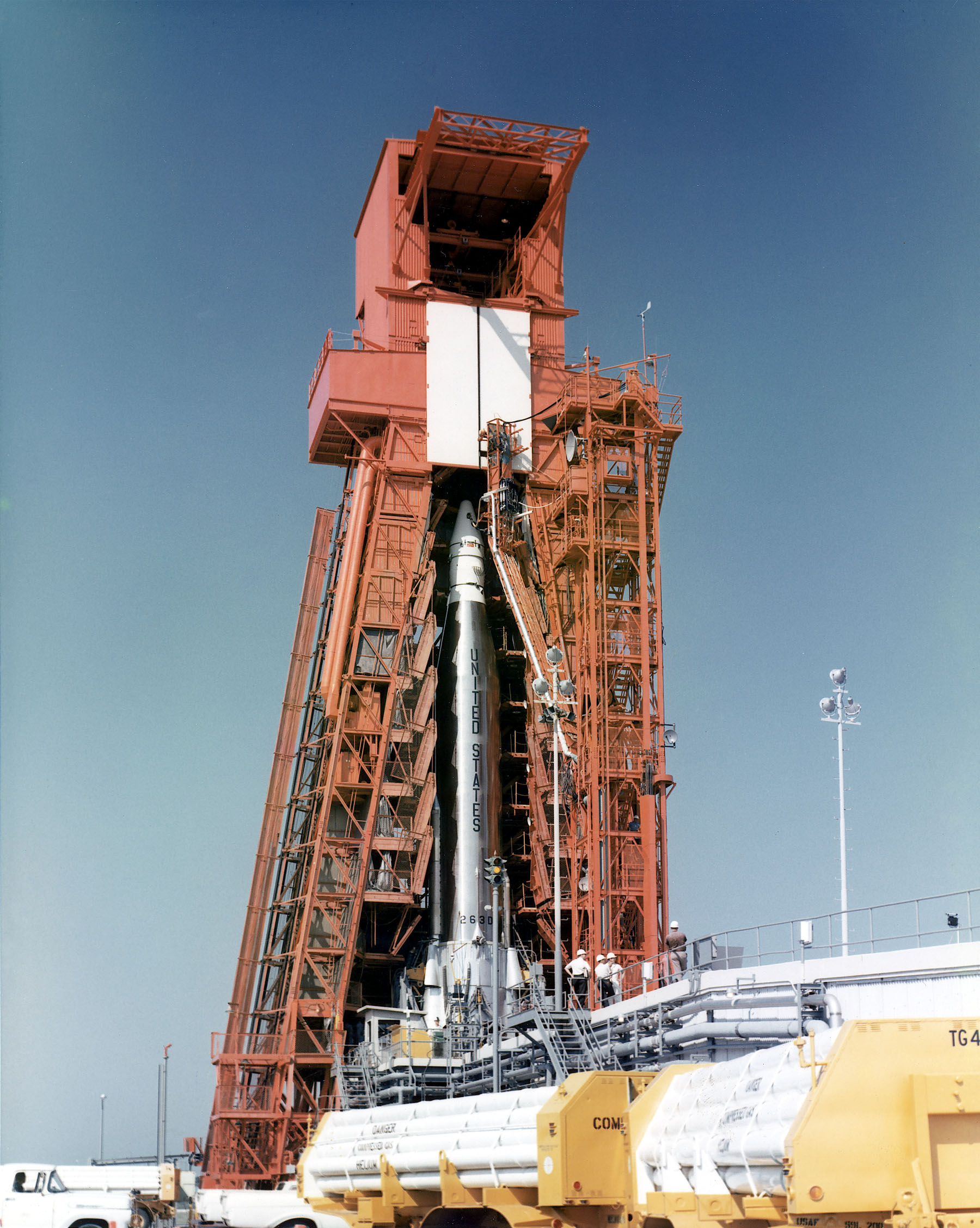
- Atlas D with FIRE 1 at LC-12
- Interactive map of Launch Complex 12
- Launch site: Cape Canaveral Space Force Station
- Location: 28°28′49″N 80°32′31″W
- Time zone: UTC−05:00 (EST)
  - Summer (DST): UTC−04:00 (EDT)
- Short name: LC-12
- Operator: United States Space Force (owner); Blue Origin (tenant)
- Total launches: 39
Launch history
- Status: Dismantled, used as storage
- First launch: 10 January 1958; Atlas A
- Last launch: 5 November 1967; Atlas-Agena (ATS-3)
- Associated rockets: Retired: SM-65 Atlas, Atlas-Able, Atlas-Agena

Launch sites at Cape Canaveral Space Force Station and Kennedy Space Center
Active pads
Repurposed pads, not used for launches
Inactive leased pads
Inactive unleased pads
1 LC-39B
2 LC-39A
3 LC-48
4 SLC-41
5 SLC-40
6 LC-47
7 SLC-37
8 LC-34
9 SLC-20
10 LC-19
11 LC-16
12 LC-15
13 LC-14
14 LC-13 (LZ-2)
15 LC-12
16 LC-11
17 LC-36
18 LC-1, LC-2, LC-3, and LC-4
19 SLC-46
20 LC-21 and LC-22
21 LC-31 and LC-32
22 LC-18
23 SLC-17
24 LC-26
25 LC-5 and LC-6
26 LC-30
27 LC-25
28 LC-29

Launch Complex 12 (LC-12) at Cape Canaveral Space Force Station, Florida was a launch pad used by Atlas rockets and missiles between 1958 and 1967. It was the second-most southern of the pads known as Missile Row, between LC-11 to the south and LC-13 to the north. Along with Complexes 11, 13 and 14, LC-12 featured a more robust design than many contemporary pads, due to the greater power of the Atlas compared to other rockets of the time. It was larger, and featured a concrete launch pedestal that was 6 metres (20 ft) tall and a reinforced blockhouse. The rockets were delivered to the launch pad by means of a ramp on the southwest side of the launch pedestal.

Currently, LC-12 is leased by Blue Origin, and has been used by them as a storage site.

== History ==
=== Atlas operations ===
Atlas A, C and D missiles were tested from the site. It was also used for orbital launches of Atlas-Able and later Atlas-Agena rockets, and two Project FIRE suborbital tests for Project Apollo, using Atlas D rockets.

LC-12's first launch was Atlas 10A on January 10, 1958. During the second half of the year, a larger umbilical service tower was built in preparation for the C series Atlas tests, flown from December 1958 to August 1959.

On 24 September 1959, the first Atlas-Able, 9C, exploded during a static firing test at LC-12, after a turbopump on one of the engines failed to trigger a complete engine shutdown. The damaged turbopump continued to allow oxidizer to flow, feeding the fire beneath the vehicle. About a minute later the rocket suffered a structural failure, collapsed and exploded. The entire service tower and both umbilical towers were knocked over and the concrete launch stand caved in. Because damage to LC-12 was so extensive, it did not host another launch until Missile 56D in May 1960. The large service tower was not rebuilt following the explosion of Atlas 9C. It then hosted more ICBM tests along with the second and third Atlas Able probes.

In 1961, LC-12 was converted to support the Atlas-Agena rocket. The first Atlas-Agena launch from LC-12 was in August 1961. On 23 April 1962, Atlas-Agena B 133D launched Ranger 4, the first American spacecraft to reach the surface of the Moon, when it made a hard landing at an impact speed of 9,617 kilometres per hour (5,976 mph).

On 27 August 1962, Mariner 2 was launched by Atlas-Agena B 179D, the first spacecraft conduct a successful flyby of another planet when it flew past Venus on 14 December 1962. On 28 July 1964, Atlas-Agena B 250D launched Ranger 7, which was the first fully successful Ranger mission. On 28 November 1964, Atlas-Agena D 288D launched with Mariner 4, which provided the first close-up pictures of Mars.

In 1967, LC-12 became the third of the four Atlas pads to be deactivated. Following deactivation, the launch tower, mobile service structure and launch support equipment were dismantled, and the site is no longer maintained for launches.

=== Blue Origin use ===
Following their leasing of the nearby Launch Complex 36 in 2015, Blue Origin looked to leasing other pads in the area as real estate to support the operation of their New Glenn launch vehicle from there. As the adjacent LC-11 had already been leased to them in 2017 as a test site for their BE-4 engine, the company also leased LC-12 the following year. Based on aerial imagery, the complex as of 2023 has been used to store test articles for New Glenn and it's Project Jarvis upper stage, as well as several hold-down points.

== Launch statistics ==
- Atlas
- Atlas-Able
- Atlas-Agena

All launches before January 1961 operated by the United States Air Force. All launches since operated by NASA.

No.	Date	Time (UTC)	Launch vehicle	Configuration	Payload	Result	Remarks
1	10 January 1958	15:48	SM-65 Atlas	Atlas A	Suborbital test	Success	First launch form LC-12.
2	20 February 1958	17:46	SM-65 Atlas	Atlas A	Suborbital test	Failure	Vernier engine transducer failed, leading to missile tumbling and self-destructing 164 second after launch.
3	3 June 1958	21:28	SM-65 Atlas	Atlas A	Suborbital test	Success	Final flight of the Atlas A.
4	24 December 1958	04:45	SM-65 Atlas	Atlas C	Suborbital test	Success	Maiden flight of the Atlas C.
5	27 January 1959	23:34	SM-65 Atlas	Atlas C	Suborbital test	Partial failure	Missile suffered guidance control failure 80 seconds after launch, however was kept on course by flight control system.
6	20 February 1959	05:38	SM-65 Atlas	Atlas C	Suborbital test	Failure	Staging mishap with valve led to loss of tank pressure in missile, leading to self-destruction 172 seconds after launch.
7	19 March 1959	00:59	SM-65 Atlas	Atlas C	Suborbital test	Failure	Electrical issues caused premature sustainer engine shutdown, leading to unstable flight trajectory.
8	21 July 1959	05:22	SM-65 Atlas	Atlas C	Suborbital test	Success	
9	24 August 1959	15:53	SM-65 Atlas	Atlas C	Suborbital test	Success	Final flight of the Atlas C. Reentry capsule on board captured photographs of Earth from space.
-	Planned for October 1959	Cancelled	Atlas-Able	Atlas C / Able	Pioneer P-1	Precluded	Part of the Pioneer program, aiming to explore the Moon. Planned first flight of the Atlas-Able. Vehicle destroyed during a static fire test on 24 September.
10	20 May 1960	15:00	SM-65 Atlas	Atlas D	Suborbital test	Success	
11	28 June 1960	02:30	SM-65 Atlas	Atlas D	Suborbital test	Success	
12	9 August 1960	18:09	SM-65 Atlas	Atlas D	Suborbital test	Success	
13	12 August 1960	13:00	SM-65 Atlas	Atlas D	Suborbital test	Success	
14	25 September 1960	15:13	Atlas-Able	Atlas D / Able	Pioneer P-30	Failure	Part of the Pioneer program, aiming to explore the Moon. First Atlas-Able launch from LC-12, and first orbital and civilian launch from the pad. Second stage suffered from propellant feed malfunction, resulting in failure to reach orbit.
15	22 October 1960	09:34	SM-65 Atlas	Atlas D	Suborbital test	Success	
16	15 November 1960	05:54	SM-65 Atlas	Atlas D	Suborbital test	Success	
17	15 December 1960	09:10	Atlas-Able	Atlas D / Able	Pioneer P-31	Failure	Part of the Pioneer program, aiming to explore the Moon. Final Atlas-Able flight. Issue in interstage resulted in LOX tank rupture, leading to self-destruction of vehicle 73 seconds after launch.
18	23 January 1961	21:02	SM-65 Atlas	Atlas D	Suborbital test	Success	
19	23 August 1961	10:04	Atlas-Agena	Atlas LV-3 / Agena-B	Ranger 1	Failure	First mission of the Ranger program, designed to take close-up pictures of the Moon's surface. Demonstration mission going to HEO. First Atlas-Agena launch from LC-12. Vehicle stranded in low Earth orbit following failure of Agena relight.
20	18 November 1961	08:12	Atlas-Agena	Atlas LV-3 / Agena-B	Ranger 2	Failure	Part of the Ranger program, designed to take close-up pictures of the Moon's surface. Demonstration mission going to HEO. Vehicle stranded in low Earth orbit following failure of Agena relight.
21	26 January 1962	20:30	Atlas-Agena	Atlas LV-3 / Agena-B	Ranger 3	Partial failure	Part of the Ranger program, designed to take close-up pictures of the Moon's surface. First mission planned to impact the Moon. Guidance failures in Atlas and Agena placed spacecraft on incorrect trajectory and headed into heliocentric orbit.
22	23 April 1962	20:50	Atlas-Agena	Atlas LV-3 / Agena-B	Ranger 4	Success	Part of the Ranger program, designed to take close-up pictures of the Moon's surface. Launch was a success, but solar panels failed to deploy and impacted the lunar surface without gathering data.
23	22 July 1962	09:21	Atlas-Agena	Atlas LV-3 / Agena-B	Mariner 1	Failure	First mission of the Mariner program, aiming to explore Venus. First American mission to another planet. Issue with guidance system programing led to erroneous flight path causing range safety protocols 294 seconds after launch.
24	27 August 1962	06:53	Atlas-Agena	Atlas LV-3 / Agena-B	Mariner 2	Success	Part of the Mariner program, aiming to explore Venus. First spacecraft to successfully visit another planet. Helped discover Venus's notably high surface temperature and atmospheric pressure.
25	18 October 1962	16:59	Atlas-Agena	Atlas LV-3 / Agena-B	Ranger 5	Success	Part of the Ranger program, designed to take close-up pictures of the Moon's surface. Launch was a success, but spacecraft malfunctioned en route and ended up in heliocentric orbit.
26	30 January 1964	15:49	Atlas-Agena	Atlas LV-3 / Agena-B	Ranger 6	Success	Part of the Ranger program, designed to take close-up pictures of the Moon's surface. Launch was a success and spacecraft operated for length of mission, but camera systems failed to operate.
27	14 April 1964	21:42	SM-65 Atlas	Atlas D	FIRE 1	Success	Suborbital launch. Part of the Apollo Program, a test flight experimenting with the heat shield to be used for the Apollo CSM.
28	28 July 1964	16:50	Atlas-Agena	Atlas LV-3 / Agena-B	Ranger 7	Success	Part of the Ranger program, designed to take close-up pictures of the Moon's surface. First completely successful Ranger mission.
29	5 September 1964	01:23	Atlas-Agena	Atlas LV-3 / Agena-B	OGO-1	Success	First mission of the Orbiting Geophysical Observatory program, aimed at studying Earth's magnetosphere.
30	28 November 1964	14:22	Atlas-Agena	Atlas LV-3 / Agena-D	Mariner 4	Success	Part of the Mariner program, aiming to explore Mars. First spacecraft to visit Mars, helping dispel beliefs such as the existence of Martian canals.
31	17 February 1965	17:05	Atlas-Agena	Atlas LV-3 / Agena-B	Ranger 8	Success	Part of the Ranger program, designed to take close-up pictures of the Moon's surface.
32	21 March 1965	21:37	Atlas-Agena	Atlas LV-3 / Agena-B	Ranger 9	Success	Last mission of the Ranger program, designed to take close-up pictures of the Moon's surface.
33	22 May 1965	13:34	SM-65 Atlas	Atlas D	FIRE 2	Success	Suborbital launch. Part of the Apollo Program, a test flight experimenting with the heat shield to be used for the Apollo CSM.
34	8 April 1966	19:35	Atlas-Agena	Atlas SLV-3 / Agena-D	OAO-1	Success	Part of the Orbiting Astronomical Observatory series of space telescopes. Launch was a success, but payload failed shortly after deploying.
35	7 June 1966	02:48	Atlas-Agena	Atlas SLV-3 / Agena-B	OGO-3	Success	Part of the Orbiting Geophysical Observatory program, aimed at studying Earth's magnetosphere.
36	7 December 1966	02:12	Atlas-Agena	Atlas SLV-3 / Agena-D	ATS-1	Success	First launch of the Applications Technology Satellites program.
37	6 April 1967	03:23	Atlas-Agena	Atlas SLV-3 / Agena-D	ATS-2	Partial failure	Part of the Applications Technology Satellites program. Agena failed to reignite, leaving payload stuck in medium Earth orbit.
38	14 June 1967	06:01	Atlas-Agena	Atlas SLV-3 / Agena-D	Mariner 5	Success	Part of the Mariner program, aiming to explore Venus and study its atmosphere and magnetic field.
39	5 November 1967	23:37	Atlas-Agena	Atlas SLV-3 / Agena-D	ATS-3	Success	Part of the Applications Technology Satellites program. Final Atlas launch from LC-12. Most recent launch from LC-12.
