= Cape Canaveral Launch Complex 16 =

Launch site at Cape Canaveral Space Force Station

Launch Complex 16
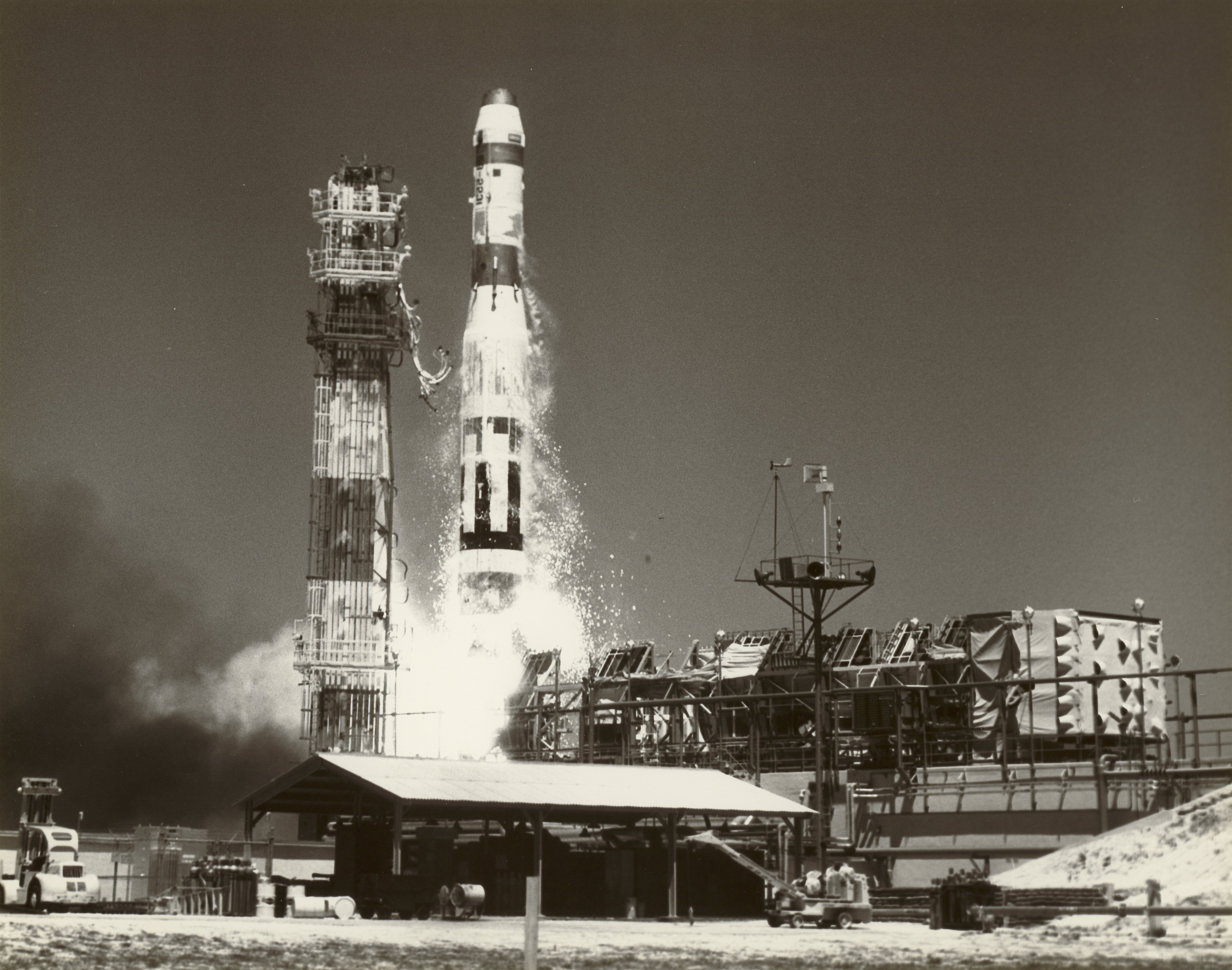
- Titan I launch from LC-16
- Interactive map of Launch Complex 16
- Launch site: Cape Canaveral Space Force Station
- Location: 28.5017°N 80.5518°W
- Time zone: UTC−05:00 (EST)
  - Summer (DST): UTC−04:00 (EDT)
- Short name: LC-16
- Operator: United States Space Force (owner); Relativity Space (tenant)
- Total launches: 150
- Launch pad: 1
- Orbital inclination range: 28° – 57°
Launch history
- Status: Undergoing renovation
- First launch: December 12, 1959; HGM-25A Titan I
- Last launch: March 23, 2023; Terran 1 ("Good Luck, Have Fun")
- Associated rockets: Future: Terran R Retired: HGM-25A Titan I, LGM-25C Titan II, Pershing 1a, Pershing II, Terran 1

Launch sites at Cape Canaveral Space Force Station and Kennedy Space Center
Active pads
Repurposed pads, not used for launches
Inactive leased pads
Inactive unleased pads
1 LC-39B
2 LC-39A
3 LC-48
4 SLC-41
5 SLC-40
6 LC-47
7 SLC-37
8 LC-34
9 SLC-20
10 LC-19
11 LC-16
12 LC-15
13 LC-14
14 LC-13 (LZ-2)
15 LC-12
16 LC-11
17 LC-36
18 LC-1, LC-2, LC-3, and LC-4
19 SLC-46
20 LC-21 and LC-22
21 LC-31 and LC-32
22 LC-18
23 SLC-17
24 LC-26
25 LC-5 and LC-6
26 LC-30
27 LC-25
28 LC-29

Launch Complex 16 (LC-16) is a launch pad site located at Cape Canaveral Space Force Station in Florida. Part of the Missile Row lineup of launch pads, it was originally built for use by LGM-25 Titan missiles in the early 1960s, a variety of NASA functions in the late 1960s, and later saw tests of MGM-31 Pershing missiles in the 1970s and 1980s.

As of August 2025, LC-16 is leased to Relativity Space, during which it is undergoing large-scale renovations for future use by their Terran R launch vehicle.

== History ==
LC-16 was originally built by the United States Air Force in the late 1950s as a way to test launches of their HGM-25A Titan I ICBMs, complementing LC-15 to the south and LC-19 and LC-20 to the north in accomplishing that task. Six Titan I missiles were launched from the complex between December 1959 and May 1960. These were followed by seven LGM-25C Titan II missiles, starting with the type's maiden flight on March 16, 1962. The last Titan II launch from LC-16 was conducted on May 29, 1963.

Following the end of its involvement with the Titan missile, LC-16 was released to NASA on September 16, 1964 , which used it for Gemini crew processing, and static firing tests of the Apollo Service Module's propulsion engine. Following its return to the Air Force in 1972, it was handed over to the United States Army and was converted for use by the MGM-31 Pershing missile, which made its first flight from the complex on May 7, 1974. Seventy-nine Pershing 1a and 49 Pershing II missiles were launched from LC-16. The last Pershing launch from the facility was conducted on March 21, 1988. It was deactivated the next day and subsequently decommissioned under the Intermediate-Range Nuclear Forces Treaty.

Following a 30 year period of inactivity, it was announced on January 17, 2019 that Relativity Space had entered a 5-year agreement with the Air Force to use LC-16 to launch their in-development lifters, the smallsat-focused Terran 1 and the heavy-lift Terran R. After spending a couple years renovating the pad to be launch-capable, Relativity performed the first orbital launch attempt from the complex with the maiden flight of Terran 1 on March 23, 2023, which resulted in a failure after the second stage failed to ignite. Following this failure, Relativity announced that they opted to retire the Terran 1 in pursuit of developing the Terran R, thereby resuming construction work on LC-16 to support the launcher. Relativity currently expects the maiden flight of Terran R to be no earlier than 2026.

== Launch statistics ==
- Titan I
- Titan II
- Pershing 1a
- Pershing II
- Terran 1
- Terran R

=== Titan ===
All launches operated by the United States Air Force.

No.	Date	Time (UTC)	Launch vehicle	Payload	Result	Remarks
1	12 December 1959	17:11	HGM-25A Titan I	Suborbital test	Failure	First launch from LC-16. Vibrations unintentionally activated range safety destruction charges during liftoff, destroying the missile.
2	5 February 1960	21:46	HGM-25A Titan I	Suborbital test	Failure	Guidance compartment suffered structural failure, leading to missile self-destruction 56 seconds after launch.
3	8 March 1960	18:00	HGM-25A Titan I	Suborbital test	Failure	Stuck valve caused gas generator failure, leading to failure of second stage start.
4	8 April 1960	Unknown	HGM-25A Titan I	Suborbital test	Success	First successful launch from LC-16.
5	28 April 1960	20:18	HGM-25A Titan I	Suborbital test	Success	
6	27 May 1960	17:20	HGM-25A Titan I	Suborbital test	Success	
7	16 March 1962	18:09	LGM-25C Titan II	Suborbital test	Success	Maiden flight of the Titan II.
8	25 July 1962	16:17	LGM-25C Titan II	Suborbital test	Success	
8	12 October 1962	16:24	LGM-25C Titan II	Suborbital test	Success	
9	6 December 1962	20:31	LGM-25C Titan II	Suborbital test	Failure	Pogo oscillation reduction experiment failed, leading to premature first stage shutdown thanks to increased vibrations.
10	10 January 1963	Unknown	LGM-25C Titan II	Suborbital test	Failure	Second stage suffered from reduced thrust, leading to impact point being well short of target.
11	9 May 1963	Unknown	LGM-25C Titan II	Suborbital test	Success	
12	29 May 1963	16:56	LGM-25C Titan II	Suborbital test	Failure	Contained pogo oscillation reduction experiment. Fuel leak led to fire in thrust section, leading to loss of control and missile self destruction 52 seconds after launch. Final Titan launch from LC-16.

=== Pershing ===
All launches operated by the United States Army.

No.	Date	Time (UTC)	Launch vehicle	Payload	Result	Remarks
13	7 May 1974	19:00	Pershing 1a	Missile test	Success	First Pershing test flight performed from LC-16, and first Pershing 1a test flight performed at Cape Canaveral.
14	7 May 1974	19:15	Pershing 1a	Missile test	Success	
15	7 May 1974	20:05	Pershing 1a	Missile test	Success	
16	7 May 1974	20:21	Pershing 1a	Missile test	Success	
17	21 May 1974	Unknown	Pershing 1a	Missile test	Failure	
18	21 May 1974	13:04	Pershing 1a	Missile test	Success	
19	21 May 1974	13:18	Pershing 1a	Missile test	Success	
20	21 May 1974	14:28	Pershing 1a	Missile test	Success	
21	31 May 1974	19:00	Pershing 1a	Missile test	Failure	
22	31 May 1974	19:15	Pershing 1a	Missile test	Success	
23	31 May 1974	20:05	Pershing 1a	Missile test	Success	
24	31 May 1974	20:21	Pershing 1a	Missile test	Success	
25	23 July 1975	15:04	Pershing 1a	Missile test	Success	
26	23 July 1975	16:38	Pershing 1a	Missile test	Success	
27	23 July 1975	16:53	Pershing 1a	Missile test	Success	
28	24 July 1975	18:49	Pershing 1a	Missile test	Success	
29	5 August 1975	16:04	Pershing 1a	Missile test	Failure	
30	5 August 1975	16:20	Pershing 1a	Missile test	Success	
31	5 August 1975	18:16	Pershing 1a	Missile test	Success	
32	5 August 1975	18:32	Pershing 1a	Missile test	Success	
33	25 August 1975	15:54	Pershing 1a	Missile test	Failure	
34	25 August 1975	17:32	Pershing 1a	Missile test	Success	
35	26 August 1975	18:32	Pershing 1a	Missile test	Success	
36	26 August 1975	18:49	Pershing 1a	Missile test	Failure	
37	26 October 1976	18:06	Pershing 1a	Missile test	Success	
38	26 October 1976	19:12	Pershing 1a	Missile test	Success	
39	26 October 1976	20:21	Pershing 1a	Missile test	Success	
40	26 October 1976	20:39	Pershing 1a	Missile test	Success	
41	17 February 1977	18:12	Pershing 1a	Missile test	Success	
42	2 March 1977	18:28	Pershing 1a	Missile test	Success	
43	2 March 1977	18:53	Pershing 1a	Missile test	Failure	
44	2 March 1977	20:31	Pershing 1a	Missile test	Success	
45	2 March 1977	21:42	Pershing 1a	Missile test	Failure	
46	13 July 1978	14:37	Pershing 1a	Missile test	Success	
47	13 July 1978	16:57	Pershing 1a	Missile test	Success	
48	13 July 1978	18:09	Pershing 1a	Missile test	Success	
49	25 July 1978	14:30	Pershing 1a	Missile test	Success	
50	25 July 1978	14:48	Pershing 1a	Missile test	Success	
51	25 July 1978	15:06	Pershing 1a	Missile test	Success	
52	25 August 1978	13:06	Pershing 1a	Missile test	Success	
53	25 August 1978	13:23	Pershing 1a	Missile test	Success	
54	25 August 1978	13:53	Pershing 1a	Missile test	Success	
55	22 February 1979	14:43	Pershing 1a	Missile test	Success	
56	22 February 1979	15:00	Pershing 1a	Missile test	Success	
57	22 February 1979	15:19	Pershing 1a	Missile test	Success	
58	25 April 1979	15:03	Pershing 1a	Missile test	Success	
59	25 April 1979	15:17	Pershing 1a	Missile test	Success	
60	25 April 1979	15:40	Pershing 1a	Missile test	Success	
61	9 May 1979	17:00	Pershing 1a	Missile test	Success	
62	9 May 1979	18:29	Pershing 1a	Missile test	Success	
63	9 May 1979	18:50	Pershing 1a	Missile test	Success	
64	12 February 1980	15:51	Pershing 1a	Missile test	Success	
65	12 February 1980	16:27	Pershing 1a	Missile test	Success	
66	23 April 1980	15:04	Pershing 1a	Missile test	Success	
67	23 April 1980	15:22	Pershing 1a	Missile test	Success	
68	23 April 1980	15:39	Pershing 1a	Missile test	Success	
69	23 April 1980	16:05	Pershing 1a	Missile test	Success	
70	7 May 1980	14:40	Pershing 1a	Missile test	Success	
71	7 May 1980	14:59	Pershing 1a	Missile test	Success	
72	7 May 1980	15:58	Pershing 1a	Missile test	Success	
73	15 May 1980	14:51	Pershing 1a	Missile test	Success	
74	4 February 1981	15:00	Pershing 1a	Missile test	Success	
75	4 February 1981	15:33	Pershing 1a	Missile test	Success	
76	4 February 1981	15:53	Pershing 1a	Missile test	Success	
77	17 February 1981	17:15	Pershing 1a	Missile test	Success	
78	17 February 1981	17:51	Pershing 1a	Missile test	Success	
79	17 February 1981	19:17	Pershing 1a	Missile test	Success	
80	7 April 1981	14:00	Pershing 1a	Missile test	Success	
81	7 April 1981	14:19	Pershing 1a	Missile test	Success	
82	7 April 1981	14:40	Pershing 1a	Missile test	Success	
83	20 January 1982	14:59	Pershing 1a	Missile test	Success	
84	20 January 1982	15:19	Pershing 1a	Missile test	Success	
85	20 January 1982	19:06	Pershing 1a	Missile test	Success	
86	24 February 1982	14:04	Pershing 1a	Missile test	Success	
87	24 February 1982	14:55	Pershing 1a	Missile test	Success	
88	24 February 1982	15:14	Pershing 1a	Missile test	Success	
89	10 March 1982	15:01	Pershing 1a	Missile test	Success	
90	10 March 1982	15:17	Pershing 1a	Missile test	Success	
91	10 March 1982	16:26	Pershing 1a	Missile test	Success	
92	22 July 1982	14:49	Pershing II	Missile test	Failure	Maiden flight of the Pershing II.
93	21 January 1983	14:48	Pershing II	Missile test	Success	
94	9 February 1983	15:06	Pershing II	Missile test	Success	
95	28 March 1983	15:29	Pershing II	Missile test	Success	
96	10 April 1983	19:55	Pershing II	Missile test	Success	
97	27 May 1983	14:48	Pershing II	Missile test	Success	
98	2 June 1983	14:46	Pershing II	Missile test	Success	
99	17 July 1983	14:15	Pershing II	Missile test	Success	
100	7 September 1983	17:04	Pershing II	Missile test	Success	
101	23 September 1983	12:05	Pershing 1a	Missile test	Success	
102	23 September 1983	13:21	Pershing 1a	Missile test	Success	
103	23 September 1983	14:34	Pershing 1a	Missile test	Success	
104	23 September 1983	14:55	Pershing 1a	Missile test	Success	
105	23 September 1983	16:17	Pershing 1a	Missile test	Success	
106	13 October 1983	16:25	Pershing 1a	Missile test	Success	
107	13 October 1983	16:50	Pershing 1a	Missile test	Success	
108	13 October 1983	17:13	Pershing 1a	Missile test	Success	
109	13 October 1983	17:43	Pershing 1a	Missile test	Success	Last Pershing 1 test launch from Cape Canaveral, with all remaining tests being performed at Fort Bliss.
110	16 May 1984	14:31	Pershing II	Missile test	Success	
111	7 August 1984	12:00	Pershing II	Missile test	Success	
112	20 September 1984	14:30	Pershing II	Missile test	Success	
113	3 October 1984	14:22	Pershing II	Missile test	Success	
114	16 December 1985	13:03	Pershing II	Missile test	Success	
115	17 December 1985	16:02	Pershing II	Missile test	Success	
116	17 December 1985	21:37	Pershing II	Missile test	Success	
117	24 June 1986	13:56	Pershing II	Missile test	Success	
118	24 June 1986	15:23	Pershing II	Missile test	Success	
119	24 June 1986	16:33	Pershing II	Missile test	Success	
120	26 June 1986	13:05	Pershing II	Missile test	Success	
121	26 June 1986	16:47	Pershing II	Missile test	Success	
122	24 March 1987	13:33	Pershing II	Missile test	Success	
123	24 March 1987	13:52	Pershing II	Missile test	Success	
124	24 March 1987	14:13	Pershing II	Missile test	Success	
125	24 March 1987	15:34	Pershing II	Missile test	Success	
126	24 March 1987	15:54	Pershing II	Missile test	Success	
127	24 March 1987	16:17	Pershing II	Missile test	Success	
128	21 May 1987	02:00	Pershing II	Missile test	Success	
129	21 May 1987	02:19	Pershing II	Missile test	Success	
130	21 May 1987	02:40	Pershing II	Missile test	Success	
131	21 May 1987	04:00	Pershing II	Missile test	Success	
132	21 May 1987	04:33	Pershing II	Missile test	Success	
133	21 May 1987	04:51	Pershing II	Missile test	Success	
134	27 July 1987	12:38	Pershing II	Missile test	Success	
135	27 July 1987	12:57	Pershing II	Missile test	Success	
136	27 July 1987	15:20	Pershing II	Missile test	Success	
137	27 July 1987	15:37	Pershing II	Missile test	Success	
138	13 January 1988	14:01	Pershing II	Missile test	Success	
139	15 February 1988	13:03	Pershing II	Missile test	Success	
140	15 February 1988	13:21	Pershing II	Missile test	Success	
141	15 February 1988	13:42	Pershing II	Missile test	Success	
142	15 February 1988	15:16	Pershing II	Missile test	Success	
143	15 February 1988	15:42	Pershing II	Missile test	Success	
144	15 February 1988	16:01	Pershing II	Missile test	Success	
145	21 March 1988	13:01	Pershing II	Missile test	Success	
146	21 March 1988	13:19	Pershing II	Missile test	Success	
147	21 March 1988	14:13	Pershing II	Missile test	Success	
148	21 March 1988	15:45	Pershing II	Missile test	Success	
149	21 March 1988	16:53	Pershing II	Missile test	Success	Final Pershing launch from Cape Canaveral. Final Pershing II test flight before their elimination in the Intermediate-Range Nuclear Forces Treaty.

=== Terran ===
All launches operated by Relativity Space.

No.	Date	Time (UTC)	Launch vehicle	Mission name	Payload	Result	Remarks
150	23 March 2023	03:25	Terran 1	"Good Luck, Have Fun"	N/A	Failure	First launch performed by Relativity Space, and only flight of the Terran 1. First orbital launch attempt from LC-16. Second stage failed to ignite after staging.

== See also ==
- Pershing missile launches
- Launch Complex 30
- Launch Complex 31

== Sources ==
- Wade, Mark. "Cape Canaveral LC16". Encyclopedia Astronautica. Archived from the original on September 10, 2003.
