= Cape Canaveral Space Launch Complex 20 =

Launch pad at Cape Canaveral, Florida

Space Launch Complex 20
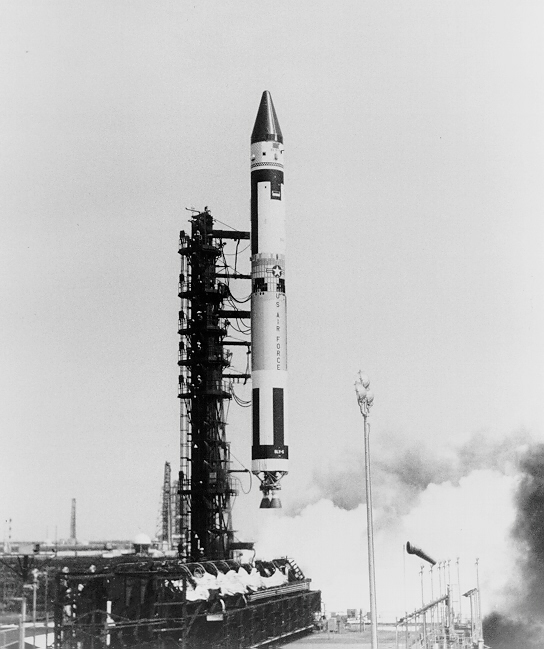
- SLC-20 in September 1964, during the inaugural launch of the Titan IIIA
- Interactive map of Space Launch Complex 20
- Launch site: Cape Canaveral Space Force Station
- Location: 28.5122°N 80.5567°W
- Time zone: UTC−05:00 (EST)
  - Summer (DST): UTC−04:00 (EDT)
- Short name: SLC-20
- Operator: United States Space Force (owner); Space Florida (tenant); Firefly Aerospace (subtenant)
- Total launches: 29
- Launch pad: 1
- Orbital inclination range: 28° - 57°
Launch history
- Status: Inactive
- First launch: July 1, 1960; HGM-25A Titan I
- Last launch: December 13, 2000; Super Loki
- Associated rockets: Future: Firefly Alpha, Eclipse; Retired: Titan I, Titan IIIA, Starbird, Prospector, Aries, LCLV, Super Loki

Launch sites at Cape Canaveral Space Force Station and Kennedy Space Center
Active pads
Repurposed pads, not used for launches
Inactive leased pads
Inactive unleased pads
1 LC-39B
2 LC-39A
3 LC-48
4 SLC-41
5 SLC-40
6 LC-47
7 SLC-37
8 LC-34
9 SLC-20
10 LC-19
11 LC-16
12 LC-15
13 LC-14
14 LC-13 (LZ-2)
15 LC-12
16 LC-11
17 LC-36
18 LC-1, LC-2, LC-3, and LC-4
19 SLC-46
20 LC-21 and LC-22
21 LC-31 and LC-32
22 LC-18
23 SLC-17
24 LC-26
25 LC-5 and LC-6
26 LC-30
27 LC-25
28 LC-29

Space Launch Complex 20 (SLC-20) is a launch site at Cape Canaveral Space Force Station, Florida. It is the northernmost launchpad in Missile Row, located at the northern terminus of ICBM Road between Launch Complex 19 and Launch Complex 34.

Originally designated as Launch Complex 20 (LC-20) by the United States Air Force, SLC-20 was historically built for launching the HGM-25A Titan I in ICBM tests, and subsequently saw use by the Titan IIIA and various sounding rockets. The pad is currently leased to Firefly Aerospace for future use by their Firefly Alpha and Eclipse launch vehicles.

== History ==
Launch Complex 20 was constructed by the United States Air Force in the late 1950s for the Titan I missile program, alongside LC-19, LC-16, and LC-15 to the south. The pad saw use in this initial configuration in 1960 and 1961, being the site of 16 Titan I launches within that period. LC-20 would later see a brief period of inactivity with the Titan I's replacement by the LGM-25C Titan II, of which only LC-15 and 16 were used for missile tests.

LC-20 and the adjacent LC-19 were modified in 1963 as part of experimentation with the Titan family to allow for orbital launches. NASA utilized LC-19 to launch the Titan II GLV as part of Project Gemini, while LC-20 was worked by the Air For the Titan III program, being used to launch the Titan IIIA and its Transtage third stage. In 1964 and 1965, the launch site was used four times by the Titan IIIA, with three of them being successful. To date, these launches are the only ones out of LC-20 to reach low Earth orbit.

Following being mothballed for two decades, LC-20 saw life with further modifications in the late 1980s for the Starbird launch vehicles associated with the shuttle Starlab mission. From 1990 to 1994, the facility saw five launches, all of them being sounding rockets. LC-20 was deactivated in 1996.

In 1999, the site was re-activated to support new launch facilities under the direction of Space Florida for commercial launches. The re-activation included upgrades to Launch Pad A and the construction of a new building along the perimeter road, northeast of the blockhouse. The next year, the pad hosted the launch of two Super Loki sounding rockets.

In 2006, the site was being used by NASA's Advanced Technology Development Center (ATDC), a research and development project to provide infrastructure to test, demonstrate and qualify new spaceport technologies. The site was shared with the Florida Air National Guard.

In February 2019, Space Florida leased the site to Firefly Aerospace so that they could launch their Alpha and Beta (since renamed to Eclipse) launch vehicles from the Space Coast's Eastern Range on prograde launch azimuths, being renamed SLC-20 to follow similar rebrandings of pads such as SLC-40 and SLC-41. To support upcoming operations at Cape Canaveral, Firefly plans to develop both manufacturing facilities at a nearby Space Florida business park as well as the launch site. This compliments a similar lease arrangement made with the military for SLC-2W at Vandenberg Space Force Base as a launch site used for polar orbital trajectories. As SLC-2W had a much more active history of being used as a launch pad (being the Western Range site of the Delta II), Firefly opted to prioritize work on there over SLC-20, seeing the maiden flight of the Alpha in September 2021.

In 2024 Firefly indicated they were maintaining their lease at SLC-20 while prioritizing Wallops Pad 0A at the Mid-Atlantic Regional Spaceport as their first East Coast launch site, primarily due to their partnership with Northrop Grumman in the development of the Antares 330 and Eclipse, also planned to be launched from LP-0A.

== Launch statistics ==
- Titan I
- Titan IIIA
- Starbird
- Prospector
- Aries (rocket)
- LCLV
- Super Loki
- Firefly Alpha
- Eclipse

=== Titan ===
All launches operated by the United States Air Force.

No.	Date	Time (UTC)	Launch vehicle	Payload	Result	Remarks
1	1 July 1960	17:29	HGM-25A Titan I	Suborbital test	Failure	First launch from LC-20. Broken hydraulic line resulted in loss of control, leading to range safety protocols being activated 11 seconds after launch.
2	28 July 1960	21:38	HGM-25A Titan I	Suborbital test	Failure	Liquid oxygen valve accidentally closed, leading to loss of thrust and premature engine shutdown.
3	30 August 1960	Unknown	HGM-25A Titan I	Suborbital test	Success	First successful launch from LC-20.
4	7 October 1960	15:50	HGM-25A Titan I	Suborbital test	Success	
5	20 December 1960	Unknown	HGM-25A Titan I	Suborbital test	Failure	Second stage gas generator failed to start.
6	10 February 1961	05:55	HGM-25A Titan I	Suborbital test	Success	
7	3 March 1961	Unknown	HGM-25A Titan I	Suborbital test	Failure	Second stage suffered from turbopump failure.
8	31 March 1961	19:42	HGM-25A Titan I	Suborbital test	Failure	First stage suffered from turbopump failure.
9	23 May 1961	Unknown	HGM-25A Titan I	Suborbital test	Success	
10	21 July 1961	02:00	HGM-25A Titan I	Suborbital test	Success	
11	4 August 1961	Unknown	HGM-25A Titan I	Suborbital test	Success	
12	7 September 1961	01:30	HGM-25A Titan I	Suborbital test	Success	
13	29 September 1961	01:52	HGM-25A Titan I	Suborbital test	Success	
14	24 October 1961	23:28	HGM-25A Titan I	Suborbital test	Success	
15	22 November 1961	00:30	HGM-25A Titan I	Suborbital test	Success	
16	13 December 1961	Unknown	HGM-25A Titan I	Suborbital test	Success	Final Titan I flight from LC-20.
17	1 September 1964	15:00	Titan IIIA	N/A	Failure	Maiden flight of the Titan IIIA and of the Titan III subfamily. Test flight of the Transtage upper stage. Transtage failed to pressurize, causing premature cutoff and failure to reach orbit.
18	10 December 1964	16:52	Titan IIIA	N/A	Success	Test flight of the Transtage upper stage. First successful Titan III launch, and first successful orbital launch from LC-20.
19	11 February 1965	15:19	Titan IIIA	LES-1	Success	
20	6 May 1965	15:00	Titan IIIA	LES-2 and LCS-1	Success	Final launch of the Titan IIIA and last Titan launch from LC-20.

=== Sounding rockets ===
Launches from 1990 to June 1991 operated by Orbital Sciences Corporation. Launches from then to 1993 operated by the Strategic Defense Initiative. Launches in 2000 operated by Space Florida.

No.	Date	Time (UTC)	Launch vehicle	Payload	Result	Remarks
21	18 December 1990	03:37	Starbird	LACE UVPI target	Success	Target rocket used to demonstrate tracking for anti-missile technology as part of the Strategic Defense Initiative. First sounding rocket launch from LC-20.
22	18 June 1991	11:34	Prospector	Joust-1	Failure	University-sponsored microgravity mission, containing various material and biological experiments. Mission failed, reaching an altitude of 0.6 km (1 mi).
23	20 August 1991	09:45	Aries	Red Tigress 1A	Failure	Target rocket used to demonstrate tracking for anti-missile technology. Mission failed, only reaching an altitude of 2 km (1.2 mi).
24	14 October 1991	10:17	Aries	Red Tigress 1B	Success	Target rocket used to demonstrate tracking for anti-missile technology.
25	23 May 1993	09:17	LCLV	Red Tigress 2A	Success	Target rocket used to demonstrate tracking for anti-missile technology.
26	28 May 1993	08:34	LCLV	Red Tigress 2B	Success	Target rocket used to demonstrate tracking for anti-missile technology.
27	21 January 2000	16:22	Super Loki	Educational test flight	Success	
28	12 December 2000	20:00	Super Loki	Educational test flight	Success	
29	13 December 2000	16:00	Super Loki	Educational test flight	Success	Most recent launch from LC-20.
