= Cape Canaveral Launch Complex 15 =

Launch pad at Cape Canaveral Space Force Station

Launch Complex 15
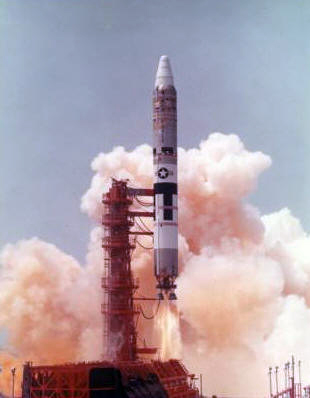
- LC-15 in July 1962, during a test launch of the LGM-25C Titan II
- Interactive map of Launch Complex 15
- Launch site: Cape Canaveral Space Force Station
- Location: 28.4963°N 80.5493°W
- Time zone: UTC−05:00 (EST)
  - Summer (DST): UTC−04:00 (EDT)
- Short name: LC-15
- Operator: United States Space Force
- Total launches: 26
- Launch pad: 1
- Orbital inclination range: 28° – 57°
Launch history
- Status: Inactive
- First launch: 6 February 1959; HGM-25A Titan I
- Last launch: 9 April 1964; LGM-25C Titan II
- Associated rockets: Retired: HGM-25A Titan I, LGM-25C Titan II; Plans cancelled: RS1

Launch sites at Cape Canaveral Space Force Station and Kennedy Space Center
Active pads
Repurposed pads, not used for launches
Inactive leased pads
Inactive unleased pads
1 LC-39B
2 LC-39A
3 LC-48
4 SLC-41
5 SLC-40
6 LC-47
7 SLC-37
8 LC-34
9 SLC-20
10 LC-19
11 LC-16
12 LC-15
13 LC-14
14 LC-13 (LZ-2)
15 LC-12
16 LC-11
17 LC-36
18 LC-1, LC-2, LC-3, and LC-4
19 SLC-46
20 LC-21 and LC-22
21 LC-31 and LC-32
22 LC-18
23 SLC-17
24 LC-26
25 LC-5 and LC-6
26 LC-30
27 LC-25
28 LC-29

Launch Complex 15 (LC-15) is an inactive launch pad located at Cape Canaveral Space Force Station in Florida. One of the eight pads that comprises Missile Row, it was originally built for and used by ICBM tests for the HGM-25A Titan I and LGM-25C Titan II programs throughout the early 1960s. Additionally, it was leased out to ABL Space Systems in order to support launches of their RS1 rocket.

Following ABL's shift away from private spaceflight and renaming to Long Wall, the current status of LC-15 is not known.

== History ==
Launch Complex 15 originally broke ground in 1957, as part of an expansion by the United States Air Force to Missile Row, which would give it the ability to launch the HGM-25A Titan I alongside the four existing SM-65 Atlas pads. LC-15 was built as the southernmost of the four Titan pads of the subsection, joined by LC-16, LC-19, and LC-20 to the north. The pad's construction saw its completion in summer 1958, and hosted its inaugural launch with the Titan I's maiden flight on February 6, 1959. In this initial configuration, LC-15 hosted ten Titan I launches, all of them successful and being used for testing reentry vehicles as well as the missile itself.

Following the last of the Titan I launches in September 1960, LC-15 underwent conversion to support the Titan I's successor, the LGM-25C Titan II. Among the changes made was the replacing of fueling from the RP-1 and liquid oxygen used by the Titan I to the hypergolic propellants used by the Titan II. The first of these launches in this new configuration was made on June 7, 1962, and the pad subsequently saw a total of 16 suborbital launches throughout the following three years. One noteworthy launch from LC-15 during this era was on February 6, 1963, which featured the first all-Air Force-personnel launch of a Titan rocket, as well as being the heaviest payload ever to fly on a missile from the Eastern Range. The final Titan II launch to occur from the pad was conducted on April 9, 1964; following this, LC-15 remained semi-active until its official decommissioning in March 1967, with structures such as the blockhouse being used as office space by NASA. Later in the year, the pad was dismantled and the launch tower was sold for scraps.

For the next 50 years, LC-15 remained untouched and was abandoned in place. Structures such as the launch table and ramp remained standing, as did the blockhouse until it was demolished in 2012. On March 7, 2023, the United States Space Force leased the pad to ABL Space Systems as part of a reactivation campaign made in the wake of the NewSpace boom of the 2010s, with the official announcement being made alongside the leasing of Launch Complex 14 (LC-14) to Stoke Space and Launch Complex 13 (LC-13) to Phantom Space and Vaya Space. The same day, ABL announced that they planned to use LC-15 for the RS1 rocket, which was at the time being launched from the Pacific Spaceport Complex on Alaska's Kodiak Island. As the pad at the time of leasing was a brownfield for the past half-century, they also clarified that the rocket would temporarily make launches from Space Launch Complex 46 (SLC-46) while the LC-15 infrastructure was being built.

In October 2024, following the accidental destruction of an RS1 to be used in the second flight, ABL announced that they would be leaving the commercial launch market in favor of pursuing missile defense. This was made official the next year, when they rebranded themselves as Long Wall, announcing that they will convert the RS1 into a target missile named the RSX. It remains unknown what is to become of LC-15 as part of this change; although official Space Force documents continue to reference the pad as being leased by ABL, the limited pad availability at Cape Canaveral may entail that Space Launch Delta 45 is willing to lease it to another launch company.

== Launch statistics ==
- Titan I
- Titan II

All launches operated by the United States Air Force.

No.	Date	Time (UTC)	Launch vehicle	Payload	Result	Remarks
1	6 February 1959	21:22	HGM-25A Titan I	Suborbital test	Success	Maiden flight of the Titan I and of the Titan rocket family. Carried a boilerplate second stage.
2	25 February 1959	19:45	HGM-25A Titan I	Suborbital test	Success	Carried a boilerplate second stage.
3	3 April 1959	17:11	HGM-25A Titan I	Suborbital test	Success	Carried a boilerplate second stage.
4	4 May 1959	18:30	HGM-25A Titan I	Suborbital test	Success	Carried a boilerplate second stage.
5	24 February 1960	Unknown	HGM-25A Titan I	Suborbital test	Success	
6	22 March 1960	Unknown	HGM-25A Titan I	Suborbital test	Success	
7	21 April 1960	21:55	HGM-25A Titan I	Suborbital test	Success	
8	13 May 1960	21:25	HGM-25A Titan I	Suborbital test	Success	
9	24 June 1960	Unknown	HGM-25A Titan I	Suborbital test	Success	
10	29 September 1960	14:20	HGM-25A Titan I	Suborbital test	Success	Final Titan I launch from LC-15.
11	7 June 1962	18:21	LGM-25C Titan II	Suborbital test	Success	First Titan II launch from LC-15.
12	11 July 1962	18:51	LGM-25C Titan II	Suborbital test	Success	
13	12 September 1962	15:50	LGM-25C Titan II	Suborbital test	Success	
14	26 October 1962	17:05	LGM-25C Titan II	Suborbital test	Success	
15	19 December 1962	20:08	LGM-25C Titan II	Suborbital test	Success	
16	6 February 1963	17:59	LGM-25C Titan II	Suborbital test	Success	
17	21 March 1963	15:23	LGM-25C Titan II	Suborbital test	Success	
18	19 April 1963	Unknown	LGM-25C Titan II	Suborbital test	Success	
19	24 May 1963	17:33	LGM-25C Titan II	Suborbital test	Success	
20	21 August 1963	23:23	LGM-25C Titan II	Suborbital test	Success	Experiment flight, testing the Gemini Malfunction Detection System.
21	1 November 1963	20:15	LGM-25C Titan II	Suborbital test	Success	Experiment flight, testing the Gemini Malfunction Detection System and attempting to limit pogo oscillation.
22	12 December 1963	20:00	LGM-25C Titan II	Suborbital test	Success	Experiment flight, testing the Gemini Malfunction Detection System and attempting to limit pogo oscillation.
23	15 January 1964	Unknown	LGM-25C Titan II	Suborbital test	Success	Experiment flight, testing the Gemini Malfunction Detection System and attempting to limit pogo oscillation.
24	26 February 1964	20:15	LGM-25C Titan II	Suborbital test	Success	
25	24 March 1964	01:42	LGM-25C Titan II	Suborbital test	Success	Experiment flight, testing the Gemini Malfunction Detection System.
26	9 April 1964	20:00	LGM-25C Titan II	Suborbital test	Success	Final Titan launch from LC-15. Most recent launch from LC-15.
