= Cape Canaveral Launch Complex 11 =

Former missile test launch site in Florida, US

Launch Complex 11
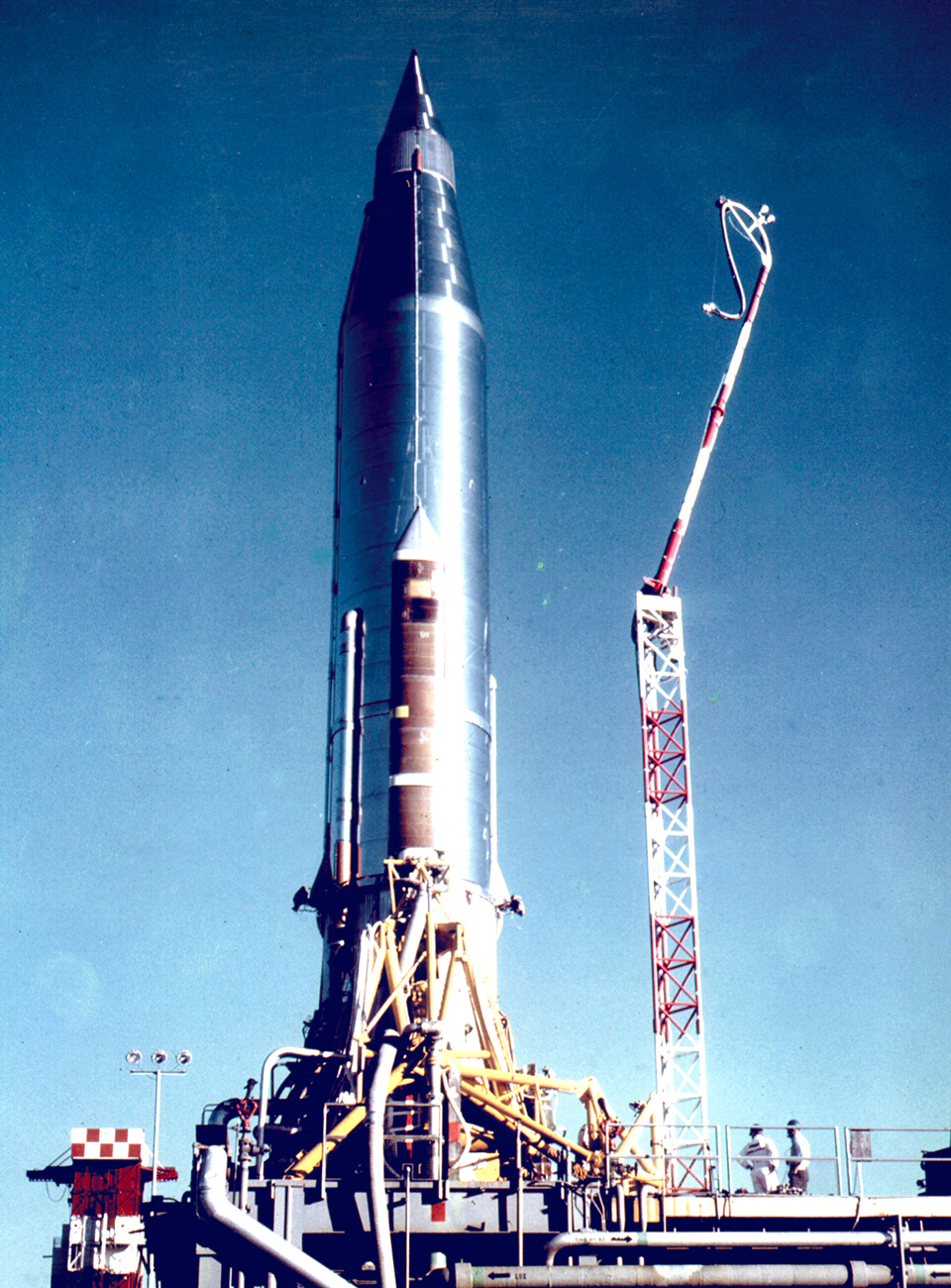
- Atlas-B with SCORE on LC-11
- Interactive map of Launch Complex 11
- Launch site: Cape Canaveral Space Force Station
- Location: 28°28′32″N 80°32′26″W
- Time zone: UTC−05:00 (EST)
  - Summer (DST): UTC−04:00 (EDT)
- Short name: LC-11
- Operator: United States Space Force (owner); Blue Origin (tenant)
- Total launches: 31
- Launch pad: 1
Launch history
- Status: Repurposed, part of wider LC-36 facility
- First launch: 19 July 1958; Atlas B
- Last launch: 1 April 1964; Atlas F
- Associated rockets: Retired: SM-65 Atlas

Launch sites at Cape Canaveral Space Force Station and Kennedy Space Center
Active pads
Repurposed pads, not used for launches
Inactive leased pads
Inactive unleased pads
1 LC-39B
2 LC-39A
3 LC-48
4 SLC-41
5 SLC-40
6 LC-47
7 SLC-37
8 LC-34
9 SLC-20
10 LC-19
11 LC-16
12 LC-15
13 LC-14
14 LC-13 (LZ-2)
15 LC-12
16 LC-11
17 LC-36
18 LC-1, LC-2, LC-3, and LC-4
19 SLC-46
20 LC-21 and LC-22
21 LC-31 and LC-32
22 LC-18
23 SLC-17
24 LC-26
25 LC-5 and LC-6
26 LC-30
27 LC-25
28 LC-29

Launch Complex 11 (LC-11) at Cape Canaveral Space Force Station, Florida, is a launch complex used by Atlas missiles between 1958 and 1964. It is the southernmost of the launch pads known as Missile Row. When it was built, it, along with complexes 12, 13 and 14, featured a more robust design than many contemporary pads, due to the greater power of the Atlas compared to other rockets of the time. It was larger, and featured a concrete launch pedestal that was 6 metres (20 ft) tall and a reinforced blockhouse. The rockets were delivered to the launch pad by a ramp on the southwest side of the launch pedestal.

Thirty-two Atlas B, D, E and F missiles were launched on suborbital test flights from LC-11. The first launch to use the complex was Atlas 3B, the first flight of a complete Atlas, which was launched on 19 July 1958. In addition to the suborbital tests, one orbital launch was conducted from the complex. On 18 December 1958, Atlas 10B launched SCORE, the world's first communications satellite, into low Earth orbit.

The area of LC-11 is currently leased to Blue Origin, where it has been incorporated into the neighboring Launch Complex 36.

== History ==
=== Explosions ===
Two on-pad explosions occurred on LC-11. The first was Missile 48D in April 1960, which suffered combustion instability and exploded on the pad. Although no specific cause for the combustion instability could be determined, the separate duct for the booster turbine exhaust had been removed from the Atlas pads at CCAS earlier in the year since it was considered unnecessary and complicated ground testing of the missiles. The failure occurred slightly under a month after Missile 51D had exploded on LC-13 due to combustion instability, and after these back-to-back failures, it was decided to put the exhaust duct back on the pads. Although there was no evidence indicating that the lack of the exhaust ducts caused the failures, program officials decided to play it safe, and in any case wanted the pads to conform with Atlas D silo configurations.

The second explosion on LC-11 was when Missile 11F blew up one second after liftoff in April 9, 1962 due to a turbopump failure. In both causes, pad damage was relatively light and LC-11 restored to use in two months.

=== Later history ===
Following the end of Atlas testing at Cape Canaveral, LC-11 was the only one of the four Atlas pads to not be used for space launches, and hence was first of the four pads to be deactivated. Following deactivation, the mobile service tower and support equipment were dismantled, and the site was unmaintained for over 50 years.

=== Blue Origin use ===
Blue Origin has leased the site to redevelop it for their use. On March 29, 2017, it was reported that Blue Origin has chosen LC-11 to conduct test firings of the BE-4 engine. LC-11 is located near Spaceport Florida Launch Complex 36, which currently supports launches of Blue Origin's New Glenn Launch Vehicle.

== Launch statistics ==
All launches operated by the United States Air Force.

| No. | Date | Time (UTC) | Launch vehicle | Configuration | Payload | Result | Remarks |
|---|---|---|---|---|---|---|---|
| 1 | 19 July 1958 | 17:36 | SM-65 Atlas | Atlas B | Suborbital test | Failure | Maiden flight of the Atlas B and first launch from LC-11. Gyro failure led to loss of control and self-destruction 43 seconds after launch. |
| 2 | 29 August 1958 | 04:30 | SM-65 Atlas | Atlas B | Suborbital test | Success | |
| 3 | 18 November 1958 | 04:00 | SM-65 Atlas | Atlas B | Suborbital test | Partial failure | Mismatch in turbopumps led to excessive fuel consumption and premature sustainer engine cutoff, leading to shorter than expected trajectory. |
| 4 | 18 December 1958 | 23:02 | SM-65 Atlas | Atlas B | SCORE | Success | First ever communications satellite, transmitting a message recorded by President Dwight D. Eisenhower from orbit. First orbital launch of an Atlas rocket, and only one so far from LC-11. |
| 5 | 4 February 1959 | 08:01 | SM-65 Atlas | Atlas B | Suborbital test | Success | Final flight of the Atlas B. |
| 6 | 29 July 1959 | 04:10 | SM-65 Atlas | Atlas D | Suborbital test | Success | |
| 7 | 6 October 1959 | 05:55 | SM-65 Atlas | Atlas D | Suborbital test | Success | |
| 8 | 29 October 1959 | 07:20 | SM-65 Atlas | Atlas D | Suborbital test | Partial failure | Ruptured liquid oxygen duct led to failure of one vernier engine, leading to loss of roll control and shorter than expected trajectory. |
| 9 | 8 March 1960 | 13:10 | SM-65 Atlas | Atlas D | Suborbital test | Success | |
| 10 | 8 April 1960 | 13:10 | SM-65 Atlas | Atlas D | Suborbital test | Failure | Combustion instability in booster engine led to missile exploding on pad. |
| 11 | 11 June 1960 | 06:30 | SM-65 Atlas | Atlas D | Suborbital test | Success | |
| 12 | 2 July 1960 | 06:58 | SM-65 Atlas | Atlas D | Suborbital test | Partial failure | Short in relay box caused decrease in performance, leading to shorter than expected trajectory. |
| 13 | 17 September 1960 | 00:50 | SM-65 Atlas | Atlas D | Suborbital test | Success | |
| 14 | 13 October 1960 | 09:34 | SM-65 Atlas | Atlas D | Suborbital test | Success | Carried biological nose cone, consisting of three mice. |
| 15 | 13 May 1961 | 02:00 | SM-65 Atlas | Atlas E | Suborbital test | Success | |
| 16 | 31 July 1961 | 21:32 | SM-65 Atlas | Atlas E | Suborbital test | Success | |
| 17 | 2 October 1961 | 18:23 | SM-65 Atlas | Atlas E | Suborbital test | Success | |
| 18 | 22 November 1961 | 21:04 | SM-65 Atlas | Atlas F | Suborbital test | Success | |
| 19 | 12 December 1961 | 20:16 | SM-65 Atlas | Atlas F | Suborbital test | Partial failure | Guidance system issue led to premature propulsion cutoff, leading to shorter than planned trajectory. |
| 20 | 21 December 1961 | 03:35 | SM-65 Atlas | Atlas F | Suborbital test | Failure | Carried biological nose cone with a rhesus monkey. Hydraulic system led to engine shutdown during staging. Nose cone successfully separated, but was failed to be recovered. |
| 21 | 9 April 1962 | 20:50 | SM-65 Atlas | Atlas F | Suborbital test | Failure | Liquid oxygen turbopump failure led to missile exploding 1 second after launch. |
| 22 | 13 August 1962 | 22:00 | SM-65 Atlas | Atlas F | Suborbital test | Success | |
| 23 | 19 September 1962 | 18:15 | SM-65 Atlas | Atlas F | Suborbital test | Success | |
| 24 | 19 October 1962 | 18:15 | SM-65 Atlas | Atlas F | Suborbital test | Success | |
| 25 | 7 November 1962 | 19:43 | SM-65 Atlas | Atlas F | Suborbital test | Success | |
| 26 | 5 December 1962 | 21:25 | SM-65 Atlas | Atlas F | Suborbital test | Success | |
| 27 | 1 March 1963 | 22:00 | SM-65 Atlas | Atlas F | Suborbital test | Success | |
| 28 | 27 April 1963 | 02:03 | SM-65 Atlas | Atlas F | Suborbital test | Success | |
| 29 | 28 October 1963 | 21:00 | SM-65 Atlas | Atlas F | Suborbital test | Failure | Hydraulic line ruptured during staging, leading to loss of control 140 seconds after launch. |
| 30 | 25 February 1964 | 20:22 | SM-65 Atlas | Atlas E | Suborbital test | Success | |
| 31 | 1 April 1964 | 20:22 | SM-65 Atlas | Atlas F | Suborbital test | Success | Final suborbital Atlas test from Cape Canaveral. Last flight from LC-11 prior to Blue Origin's incorporation of the pad into LC-36. |
