= Cape Canaveral Launch Complex 18 =

Rocket launch site in Cape Canaveral, Florida

Launch Complex 18
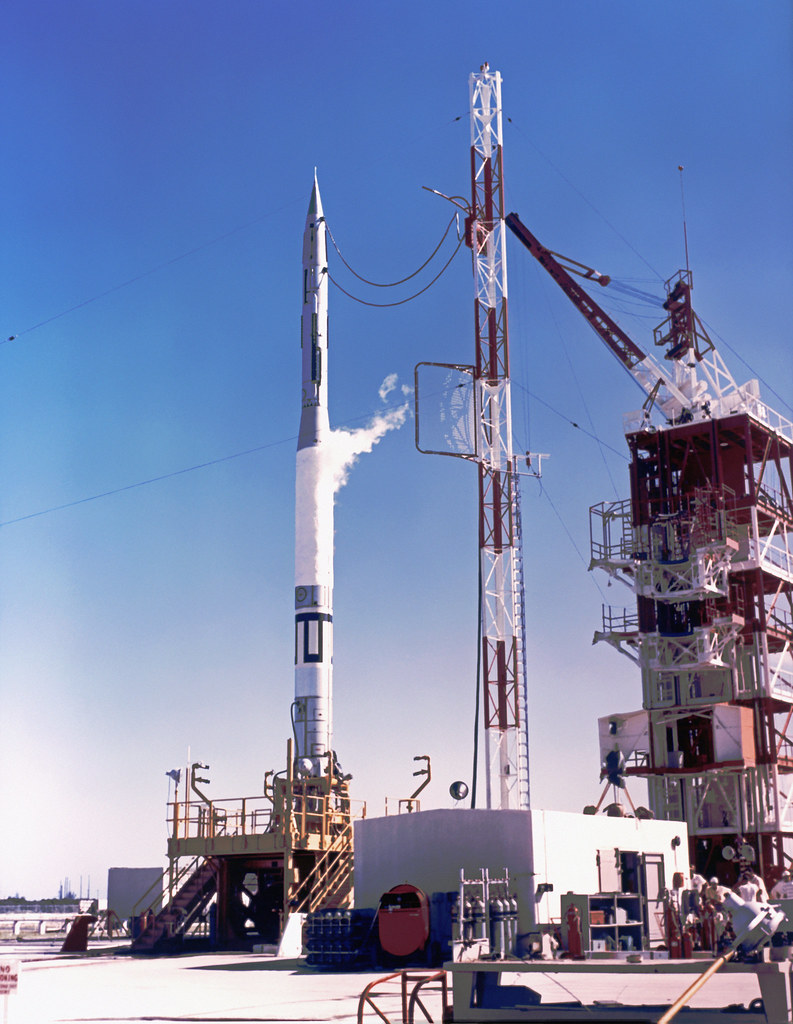
- Vanguard TV3 at LC-18A prior to its launch attempt
- Interactive map of Launch Complex 18
- Launch site: Cape Canaveral Space Force Station
- Location: 28.4493°N 80.5623°W
- Time zone: UTC−05:00 (EST)
  - Summer (DST): UTC−04:00 (EDT)
- Short name: LC-18
- Operator: United States Space Force (owner); Blue Origin (tenant)
- Total launches: 47
- Launch pad: Two
LC-18A launch history
- Status: Repurposed, facility on site under construction
- Launches: 24
- First launch: 8 December 1956; Viking / Vanguard TV0
- Last launch: 9 June 1965; Blue Scout Jr / AFWL-304
- Associated rockets: Viking; Vanguard; XRM-91 Blue Scout Junior
LC-18B launch history
- Status: Repurposed, facility on site under construction
- Launches: 23
- First launch: 4 June 1958; PGM-17 Thor
- Last launch: 12 April 1962; RM-89 Blue Scout I
- Associated rockets: PGM-17 Thor; RM-89 Blue Scout I RM-90 Blue Scout II

Launch sites at Cape Canaveral Space Force Station and Kennedy Space Center
Active pads
Repurposed pads, not used for launches
Inactive leased pads
Inactive unleased pads
1 LC-39B
2 LC-39A
3 LC-48
4 SLC-41
5 SLC-40
6 LC-47
7 SLC-37
8 LC-34
9 SLC-20
10 LC-19
11 LC-16
12 LC-15
13 LC-14
14 LC-13 (LZ-2)
15 LC-12
16 LC-11
17 LC-36
18 LC-1, LC-2, LC-3, and LC-4
19 SLC-46
20 LC-21 and LC-22
21 LC-31 and LC-32
22 LC-18
23 SLC-17
24 LC-26
25 LC-5 and LC-6
26 LC-30
27 LC-25
28 LC-29

Launch Complex 18 (LC-18) is a launch site at Cape Canaveral Space Force Station in Florida, primarily used by early suborbital and orbital rockets during the late 1950s and early 1960s. The complex consists of two pads: Launch Complex 18A (LC-18A), originally built by the United States Navy for use in Project Vanguard, and Launch Complex 18B (LC-18B), used by the United States Air Force for tests of the PGM-17 Thor.

As of September 2026, the site of LC-18 is being used by Blue Origin to construct a payload processing facility for their New Glenn launch vehicle.

== History ==
The first launch from LC-18 was a Viking rocket from LC-18A on December 8, 1956, on a test flight for Project Vanguard. A further Viking launch was conducted in May 1957, and the Vanguard made its maiden flight from the complex in September. Following this, the United States first satellite launch attempt was made from LC-18A, using Vanguard TV3, on December 6, 1957. The launch failed after the rocket lost thrust and exploded on the launch pad. All twelve Vanguard launches were conducted from LC-18A, with the complex being transferred to NASA after it took over responsibility for Vanguard following its formation in 1958. After the Vanguard's retirement in 1959, LC-18A was transferred to the US Air Force for use by Scout rockets.

LC-18B was used for 17 tests of Thor missiles between June 4, 1958 and February 29, 1960. Following this, it was also converted for use by Scout rockets.

Sixteen Scouts were launched from LC-18; ten from LC-18A and six from LC-18B. Fifteen of the launches were suborbital sounding flights, and one was an orbital launch with the Mercury-Scout 1 satellite for NASA. This failed to reach orbit and was destroyed by range safety 43 seconds after launch. The launches from LC-18A used the Blue Scout Junior configuration, and were conducted between September 21, 1960 and June 9, 1965. The launches from LC-18B consisted of three Blue Scout I rockets and three Blue Scout IIs, launched between January 7, 1961 and April 12, 1962.

Following the retirement of the Scout family at Cape Canaveral (opting instead to have launches conducted from the Wallops Flight Facility), LC-18 has sat dormant. As of August 2024, the United States Space Force plans to fully demolish the site and the neighboring SLC-17 in favor of extending Lighthouse Road and reconnecting its two separate sections back together.

== Launch statistics ==
=== LC-18A ===
- Vanguard
- Thor-Able
- Blue Scout

=== LC-18B ===
- Thor
- Blue Scout
