= Cape Canaveral Launch Complex 22 =

Launch Complex 22
- Interactive map of Launch Complex 22
- Launch site: Cape Canaveral Space Force Station
- Location: 28.4610°N 80.5398°W
- Time zone: UTC−05:00 (EST)
  - Summer (DST): UTC−04:00 (EDT)
- Short name: LC-22
- Operator: United States Space Force
- Launch pad: 1
Launch history
- Status: Inactive
- Launches: 23
- First launch: March 13, 1957
- Last launch: June 24, 1960
- Associated rockets: XSM-73 Bull Goose; MGM-13 Mace

Launch sites at Cape Canaveral Space Force Station and Kennedy Space Center
Active pads
Repurposed pads, not used for launches
Inactive leased pads
Inactive unleased pads
1 LC-39B
2 LC-39A
3 LC-48
4 SLC-41
5 SLC-40
6 LC-47
7 SLC-37
8 LC-34
9 SLC-20
10 LC-19
11 LC-16
12 LC-15
13 LC-14
14 LC-13 (LZ-2)
15 LC-12
16 LC-11
17 LC-36
18 LC-1, LC-2, LC-3, and LC-4
19 SLC-46
20 LC-21 and LC-22
21 LC-31 and LC-32
22 LC-18
23 SLC-17
24 LC-26
25 LC-5 and LC-6
26 LC-30
27 LC-25
28 LC-29

Launch Complex 22 (LC-22) at Cape Canaveral Space Force Station, Florida, United States, is a launch complex that was used for horizontal launches of cruise missiles between 1957 and 1960. It consisted of two launch rails, from which XSM-73 Bull Goose and MGM-13 Mace missiles were tested. Unlike the other Mace launch site, Launch Complex 21, no concrete structure was built to enclose the launch rails when it was converted to launch the Mace in 1959. This earned the pad the nickname of "the softsite".

== History ==
Construction of LC-22 started in 1956, leading to acceptance into military service on 26 February 1957, with Launch Complex 21. The first test of a Bull Goose rocket from LC-22 occurred on 13 March 1957, and the last occurred on 28 November 1958.

Following the end of Bull Goose test flights, Complex 22 was renovated for the Mace missile. The first Mace launch from LC-22 occurred on 29 October 1959, with final launch from the complex occurring on 24 June 1960.

After the last launch, the complex was retained as a backup site until the 1970s, in case a future missile needed to use it. As of 2009, the blockhouse, and many of the support structures erected at the pad, were still standing.
