= Cape Canaveral Space Launch Complex 46 =

Launch complex in Florida, US

Space Launch Complex 46
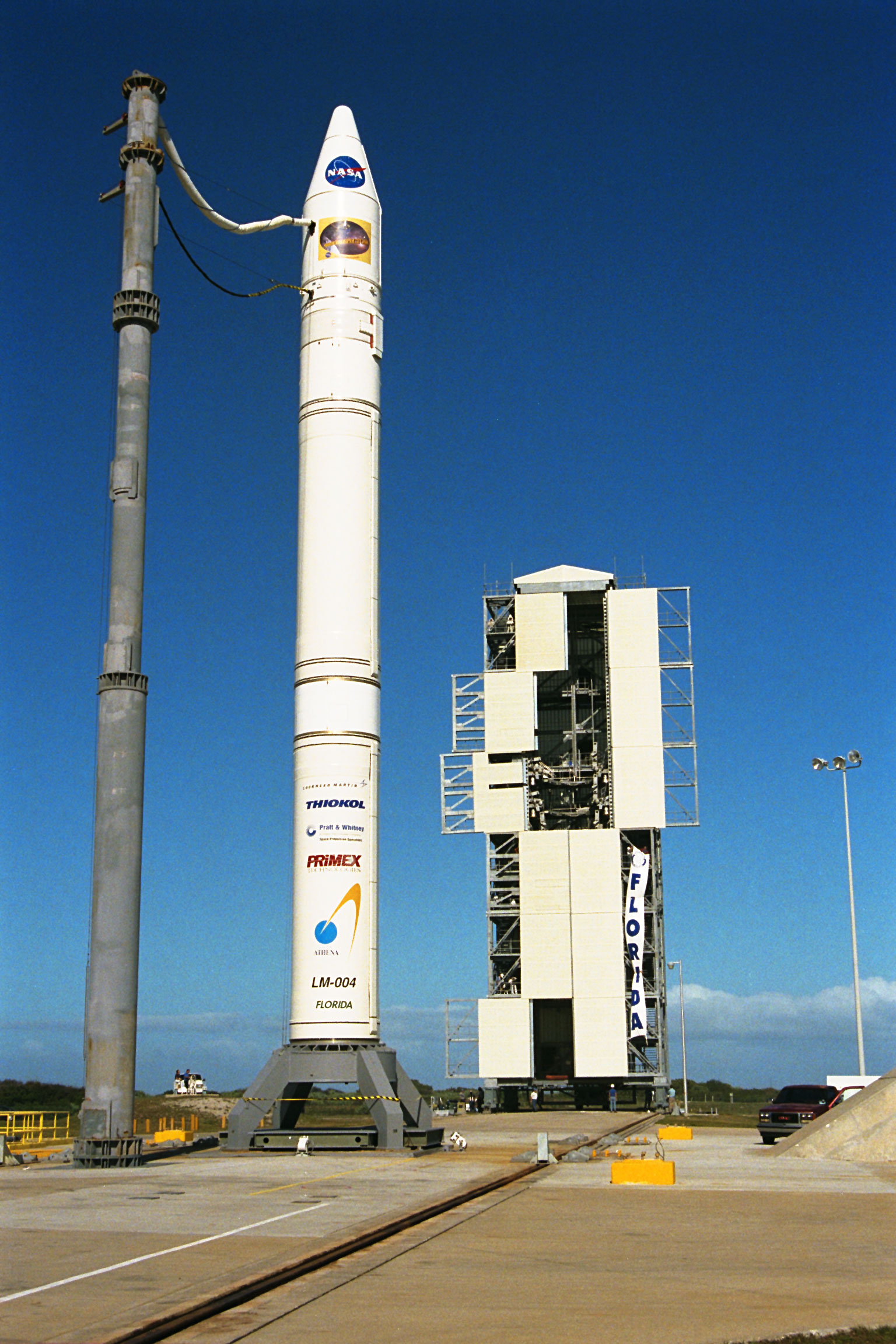
- An Athena II at LC-46 prior to the launch of Lunar Prospector.
- Interactive map of Space Launch Complex 46
- Launch site: Cape Canaveral Space Force Station
- Location: 28°27′30″N 80°31′42″W
- Time zone: UTC−05:00 (EST)
  - Summer (DST): UTC−04:00 (EDT)
- Short name: SLC-46
- Operator: United States Space Force (owner); Space Florida (tenant); Astra Space (subtenant)
Launch history
- Status: Active
- Launches: 27
- First launch: January 15, 1987; UGM-133 Trident II
- Last launch: April 25, 2025; Dark Eagle
- Associated rockets: Active: Dark Eagle; Future: Rocket 4/5; Retired: UGM-133 Trident II, Athena I, Athena II, Minotaur IV, Orion Abort Test Booster, Rocket 3 Plans cancelled: RS1

Launch sites at Cape Canaveral Space Force Station and Kennedy Space Center
Active pads
Repurposed pads, not used for launches
Inactive leased pads
Inactive unleased pads
1 LC-39B
2 LC-39A
3 LC-48
4 SLC-41
5 SLC-40
6 LC-47
7 SLC-37
8 LC-34
9 SLC-20
10 LC-19
11 LC-16
12 LC-15
13 LC-14
14 LC-13 (LZ-2)
15 LC-12
16 LC-11
17 LC-36
18 LC-1, LC-2, LC-3, and LC-4
19 SLC-46
20 LC-21 and LC-22
21 LC-31 and LC-32
22 LC-18
23 SLC-17
24 LC-26
25 LC-5 and LC-6
26 LC-30
27 LC-25
28 LC-29

The Space Launch Complex 46 (SLC-46), previously Launch Complex 46 (LC-46), is a launch complex at Cape Canaveral Space Force Station operated under license by Space Florida previously used for Athena rocket launches. It has been used by Astra Space for the Rocket 3 system and is currently used as a multipurpose launch pad.

== History ==
=== Construction and Trident Operations ===
This complex was built as part of the United States Navy's Trident II submarine-launch missile development effort. Construction was underway by early February 1984, with the first Trident II launch LC-46 occurring on 15 January 1987. A total of 19 Trident IIs were launched from the site between 15 January 1987 and 27 January 1989. After this, all subsequent Trident II testing took place at sea, and the site was deactivated.

During the construction of then-called LC-46, the nearby sounding rocket complex LC-43 was demolished. Its operations were transferred to LC-47.

=== Space Florida ===
In 1997, Space Florida began operations at the site, and was opened for commercial space operations. Lockheed Martin launched an Athena II and an Athena I from the pad in 1998 and 1999 respectively. The Athena II, launched January 7, 1998, carried the Lunar Prospector spacecraft which orbited the Moon. On January 27, 1999, the Athena I lifted off with Taiwan's first satellite, ROCSAT-1, carrying experimental communications, ocean imagery, and ionospheric studies instruments.

In March 2010, the USAF 45th Space Wing issued Real Property Licenses to Space Florida for Launch Complexes 36 and 46 at Cape Canaveral Air Force Station. On July 1, 2010, the Federal Aviation Administration approved a Launch Site Operator's License for commercial launches at Launch Complex 46.

On September 24, 2010, the Economic Development Commission of Florida's Space Coast was awarded a $500,000 Defense Infrastructure Grant from the State of Florida to be used for critical communications upgrades at SLC-46. In early 2014, Space Florida contracted with Alliant Techsystems (ATK) to begin phase three of the communications infrastructure refurbishment, with completion expected to take one year.

In July 2015, the U.S. Air Force and Orbital ATK announced a Minotaur IV launched from SLC-46 would be used for the ORS-5 mission in 2017. ORS-5 was successfully launched on August 26, 2017.

=== Ascent Abort-2 ===
On July 2, 2019, NASA launched a repurposed Peacekeeper missile from SLC-46, carrying the Orion spacecraft for the Ascent Abort-2 mission. The mission's goal was to demonstrate and qualify the Orion Launch Abort System (LAS) that will allow the astronaut crew to safely escape in the event of an emergency during launch pad operations, through the ascent phase of the Orion vehicle.

=== Astra ===
On December 6, 2021, Astra announced plans to launch its small orbital rockets from SLC-46 as soon as February 2022. The company was planning for a launch cadence of once a month for two years.

On 10 February 2022, the first Astra launch from SLC-46 resulted in failure. After two previous scrubbed launch attempts in the preceding days, the launch of the rocket occurred nominally. However, first stage separation failed, leading to the second stage to spin out of control, and the rocket and payload were lost.

On 12 June 2022, the second Astra launch from SLC-46 also resulted in failure. Astra's Rocket 3.3 vehicle (serial number LV0010) carrying two TROPICS CubeSats for NASA failed to reach orbit and the satellites were lost.

=== ABL and Dark Eagle ===
In March 2023, ABL Space Systems announced that they would be using SLC-46 as a temporary launching site for their RS1. That month, they were leased Launch Complex 15 by the United States Space Force, and clarified that this measure was taken while LC-15 undergoes reactivation. ABL stated their first launch from Pad 46 would happen later in the year. However, no launch has yet occurred and future outlooks remain in question following ABL's shift from commercial launches to military applications in October 2024.

On December 12, 2024, the United States Army and United States Navy launched and tested their Dark Eagle Long-Range Hypersonic Weapon from SLC-46 in a joint exercise. A second test was conducted the next year, on April 25.

=== Future Super-Heavy launch ===
On December 19, 2025, the United States Space Force issued an RFI to lease SLC-46 for launches of a Super-Heavy class launch vehicle.

== Launch statistics ==
- Trident II
- Athena I
- Athena II
- Minotaur IV
- Orion Abort Test Booster
- Astra Rocket
- Dark Eagle

=== Trident II ===
All launches operated by the United States Navy.

No.	Date	Time (UTC)	Launch vehicle	Mission	Result	Remarks
1	15 January 1987	15:25	UGM-133 Trident II	Suborbital test	Success	Maiden flight of the Trident II and first launch from LC-46.
2	17 March 1987	17:25	UGM-133 Trident II	Suborbital test	Success	
3	30 April 1987	20:44	UGM-133 Trident II	Suborbital test	Success	
4	12 June 1987	22:45	UGM-133 Trident II	Suborbital test	Success	
5	20 July 1987	20:45	UGM-133 Trident II	Suborbital test	Success	
6	8 September 1987	22:01	UGM-133 Trident II	Suborbital test	Success	
7	6 October 1987	17:02	UGM-133 Trident II	Suborbital test	Success	
8	11 December 1987	13:26	UGM-133 Trident II	Suborbital test	Success	
9	21 January 1988	10:08	UGM-133 Trident II	Suborbital test	Failure	
10	7 April 1988	04:59	UGM-133 Trident II	Suborbital test	Success	
11	28 April 1988	04:52	UGM-133 Trident II	Suborbital test	Success	
12	26 May 1988	02:07	UGM-133 Trident II	Suborbital test	Success	
13	7 July 1988	22:38	UGM-133 Trident II	Suborbital test	Failure	
14	27 August 1988	20:04	UGM-133 Trident II	Suborbital test	Success	
15	19 September 1988	17:44	UGM-133 Trident II	Suborbital test	Failure	
16	7 November 1988	16:30	UGM-133 Trident II	Suborbital test	Success	
17	16 December 1988	12:49	UGM-133 Trident II	Suborbital test	Success	
18	9 January 1989	10:52	UGM-133 Trident II	Suborbital test	Success	
19	26 January 1989	09:07	UGM-133 Trident II	Suborbital test	Success	Final Trident II launch from LC-46, prior to relocation of tests to Ohio-class submarines.

=== Post-Trident II ===
All launches before 2006 overseen by the United States Air Force. All launches since then overseen by Space Florida.

No.	Date	Time (UTC)	Launch vehicle	Operator	Mission/payload	Result	Remarks
20	7 January 1998	02:28	Athena II	Lockheed Martin	Lunar Prospector	Success	Part of the Discovery Program, designed to survey composition, magnetic fields, and gravity fields of the Moon. First mission from Cape Canaveral to enter lunar orbit since Explorer 49 in 1973. First Athena launch from Cape Canaveral, and first civilian and orbital launch from SLC-46.
21	27 January 1999	00:34	Athena I	Lockheed Martin	Formosat-1	Success	Final Athena flight from Cape Canaveral.
22	26 August 2017	06:04	Mintoaur IV	Orbital ATK	ORS-5	Success	First flight of the Minotaur family from Cape Canaveral.
23	2 July 2019	11:00	Orion Abort Test Booster	NASA	Ascent Abort-2	Success	Launch escape system test using a boilerplate Orion capsule, using a modified LGM-118 Peacekeeper first stage as a booster. First flight of the Artemis Program following its official proclamation in 2017.
24	10 February 2022	20:00	Rocket 3.3	Astra Space	ELaNa 41	Failure	First Astra Rocket launch from Cape Canaveral. Payload fairings failed to separate, resulting in second stage igniting while encapsulated and vehicle being lost.
25	12 June 2022	17:43	Rocket 3.3	Astra Space	TROPICS	Failure	Warmer weather at Cape Canaveral compared to other launch site at Kodiak led to faster fuel consumption than expected, resulting in failure to reach orbit. Final flight of the Rocket 3.
26	12 December 2024	16:30	Dark Eagle	United States Army and United States Navy	Missile test	Success	
27	25 April 2025	Unknown	Dark Eagle	United States Army and United States Navy	Missile test	Success	

== See also ==
- List of Cape Canaveral and Merritt Island launch sites
