= Cape Canaveral Launch Complex 30 =

Launch pad at Cape Canaveral, Florida

Launch Complex 30
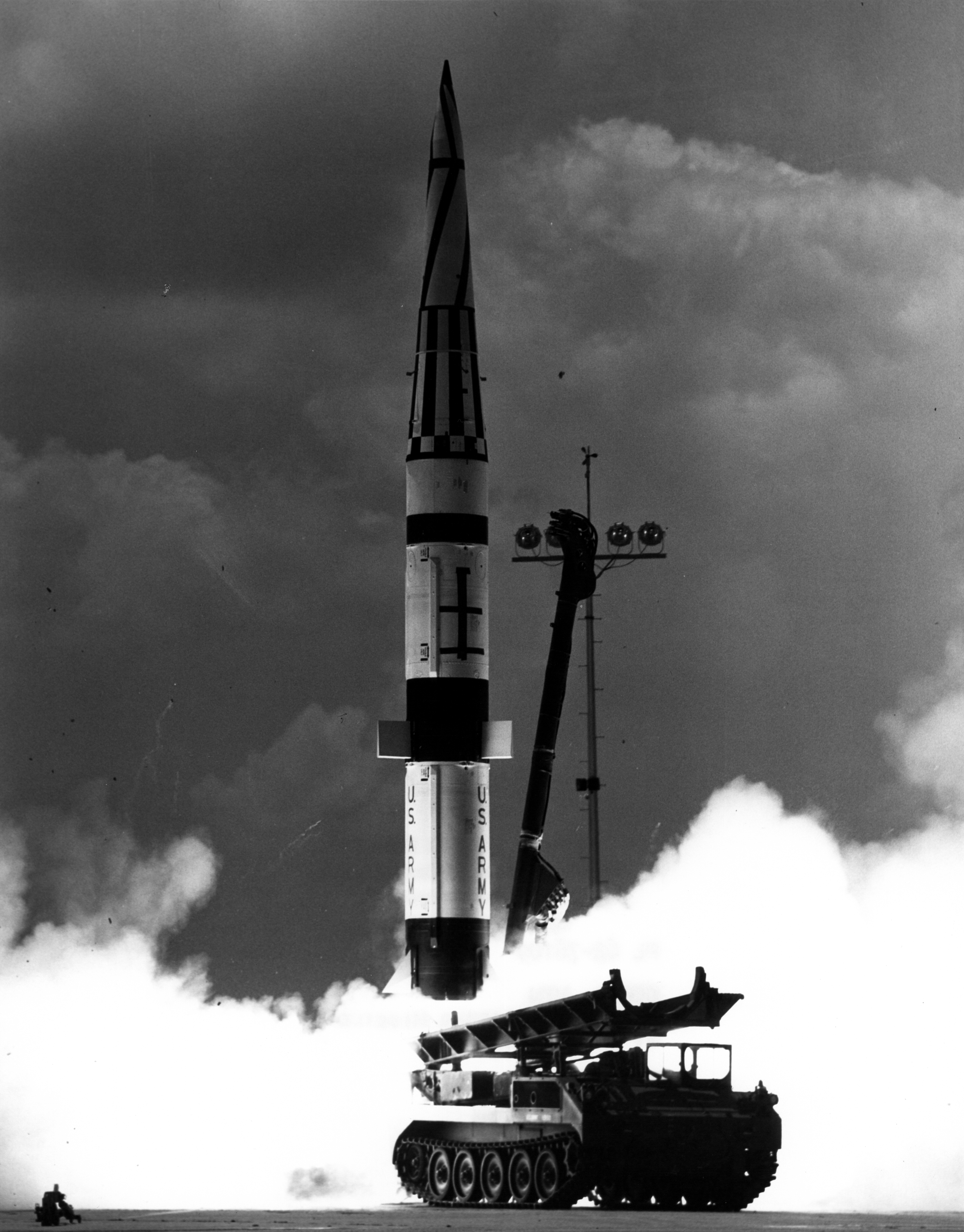
- A Pershing 1 launches from LC-30A in April 1962.
- Interactive map of Launch Complex 30
- Launch site: Cape Canaveral Space Force Station
- Location: 28°26′22″N 80°34′50″W
- Time zone: UTC−05:00 (EST)
  - Summer (DST): UTC−04:00 (EDT)
- Short name: LC-30
- Operator: United States Space Force
- Total launches: 56
- Launch pad: 2
Launch history
- Status: Inactive
- First launch: 25 February 1960; Pershing 1 (P-01 test)
- Last launch: 24 April 1963; Pershing 1 (P-56 test)
- Associated rockets: MGM-31 Pershing

Launch sites at Cape Canaveral Space Force Station and Kennedy Space Center
Active pads
Repurposed pads, not used for launches
Inactive leased pads
Inactive unleased pads
1 LC-39B
2 LC-39A
3 LC-48
4 SLC-41
5 SLC-40
6 LC-47
7 SLC-37
8 LC-34
9 SLC-20
10 LC-19
11 LC-16
12 LC-15
13 LC-14
14 LC-13 (LZ-2)
15 LC-12
16 LC-11
17 LC-36
18 LC-1, LC-2, LC-3, and LC-4
19 SLC-46
20 LC-21 and LC-22
21 LC-31 and LC-32
22 LC-18
23 SLC-17
24 LC-26
25 LC-5 and LC-6
26 LC-30
27 LC-25
28 LC-29

Launch Complex 30 (LC-30) is a former launch complex at Cape Canaveral Space Force Station, Florida. Located in the southern portion of Cape Canaveral, the complex was used by the United States Army to conduct research tests of their Pershing I missile from 1960 to 1963. It consists of two pads, LC-30A and LC-30B, the latter of which was never used.

== History ==
Launch Complex 30 was originally constructed from 1958 to 1960 as part of the early expansion of Cape Canaveral's rocketry activities. It was designed in mind for use by the United States Army to test the MGM-31 Pershing, an SRBM planned to be used as a theater ballistic missile, differing from the other more strategic long-range missiles being launched from the area. The construction is noteworthy for the blockhouse built for LC-30, being the only one in the entire Cape to be multilevel, consisting of two stories.

The first launch from LC-30 came on February 25, 1960, seeing the maiden flight of the Pershing I take off from LC-30A. Over the next three years, the complex would see a total of 56 launches, the entirety of them being from pad 30A. With the missile getting activated for military use in 1962, LC-30 would get deactivated and placed into caretaker status the next year, seeing its most recent launch to date on April 24, 1963.

In February 1968, the mobile service towers for the pads were demolished and sold for scrap. The next month, use of LC-30 was given to the United States Navy as a facility to use for the assembly of the Mark 48 torpedo for use in sea tests.

In the present day, the facility is used by various contractors in support of various other operations at CCSFS, with the blockhouse getting converted into office space. Additionally, there is a Pershing I on display at LC-30 to showcase the facility's previous use in missile tests.

== See also ==
- Pershing missile launches
- Launch Complex 16
- Launch Complex 31
