= Cape Canaveral Launch Complex 21 =

Launch Complex 21
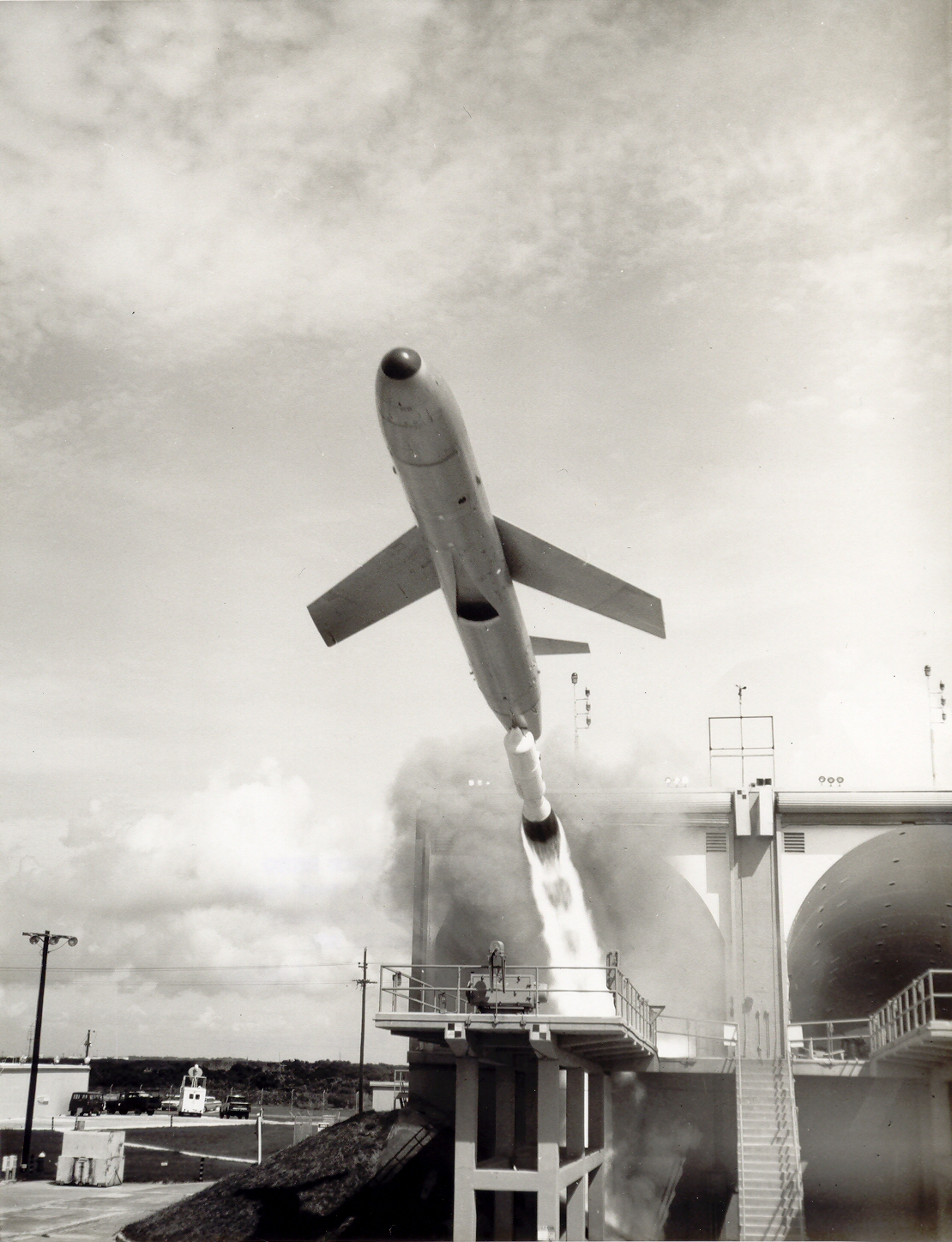
- Mace launch from LC-21
- Interactive map of Launch Complex 21
- Launch site: Cape Canaveral Space Force Station
- Location: 28°27′38″N 80°32′24″W
- Time zone: UTC−05:00 (EST)
  - Summer (DST): UTC−04:00 (EDT)
- Short name: LC-21
- Operator: United States Space Force
- Total launches: 41
- Launch pad: 2
LC-21/1 launch history
- Status: Inactive
- Launches: 38
- First launch: 24 July 1958
- Last launch: 17 July 1963
- Associated rockets: XSM-73 Bull Goose; MGM-13 Mace
LC-21/2 launch history
- Status: Inactive
- Launches: 3
- First launch: 4 December 1962
- Last launch: 28 June 1963
- Associated rockets: MGM-13 Mace

Launch sites at Cape Canaveral Space Force Station and Kennedy Space Center
Active pads
Repurposed pads, not used for launches
Inactive leased pads
Inactive unleased pads
1 LC-39B
2 LC-39A
3 LC-48
4 SLC-41
5 SLC-40
6 LC-47
7 SLC-37
8 LC-34
9 SLC-20
10 LC-19
11 LC-16
12 LC-15
13 LC-14
14 LC-13 (LZ-2)
15 LC-12
16 LC-11
17 LC-36
18 LC-1, LC-2, LC-3, and LC-4
19 SLC-46
20 LC-21 and LC-22
21 LC-31 and LC-32
22 LC-18
23 SLC-17
24 LC-26
25 LC-5 and LC-6
26 LC-30
27 LC-25
28 LC-29

Launch Complex 21 (LC-21) at Cape Canaveral Space Force Station, Florida is a launch complex that was used for horizontal launches of cruise missiles between 1958 and 1963. It initially consisted of a single launch rail, from which XSM-73 Bull Goose missiles were tested. Between 1959 and 1960, the complex was rebuilt for the MGM-13 Mace, with a second rail added, and a large concrete structure erected around the launch rails, earning the pad the nickname of "the hardsite".

It shared a blockhouse with Launch Complex 22 was also used for Bull Goose and Mace launches. Unusual for a U.S. launch site, the individual pads in the complex have numerical designations, similar to those used by the Soviet Union, rather than alphabetical designations as used on most other U.S. complexes.

== History ==
Construction at LC-21 started in 1956, leading to acceptance into military service on 26 February 1957, with Launch Complex 22. The first test of a Bull Goose rocket from LC-21 occurred on 24 July 1958. All Bull Goose launches from LC-21 used rail 1. The last Bull Goose launch from LC-21 was conducted on 5 December 1958.

Following the end of Bull Goose test flights, Complex 21 was renovated for the Mace rocket. This involved the addition of the second launch rail, and the construction of a concrete structure surrounding the complex. The first Mace launch from LC-21/1 occurred on 11 July 1960. This was followed on 4 December 1962 with the first launch from LC-21/2. LC-21/1 was used for 34 Mace launches, whilst LC-21/2 was used for three. The last launch from rail 2 occurred on 28 June 1963, followed by the final launch from the complex, using rail 21, on 17 July 1963.

After the last launch, the complex was retained as a backup site until the 1970s, in case a future missile needed to use it. As of 2009, the complex was still standing.
