= Cape Canaveral Launch Complex 47 =

Sounding rocket launch complex at Cape Canaveral, Florida

Launch Complex 47
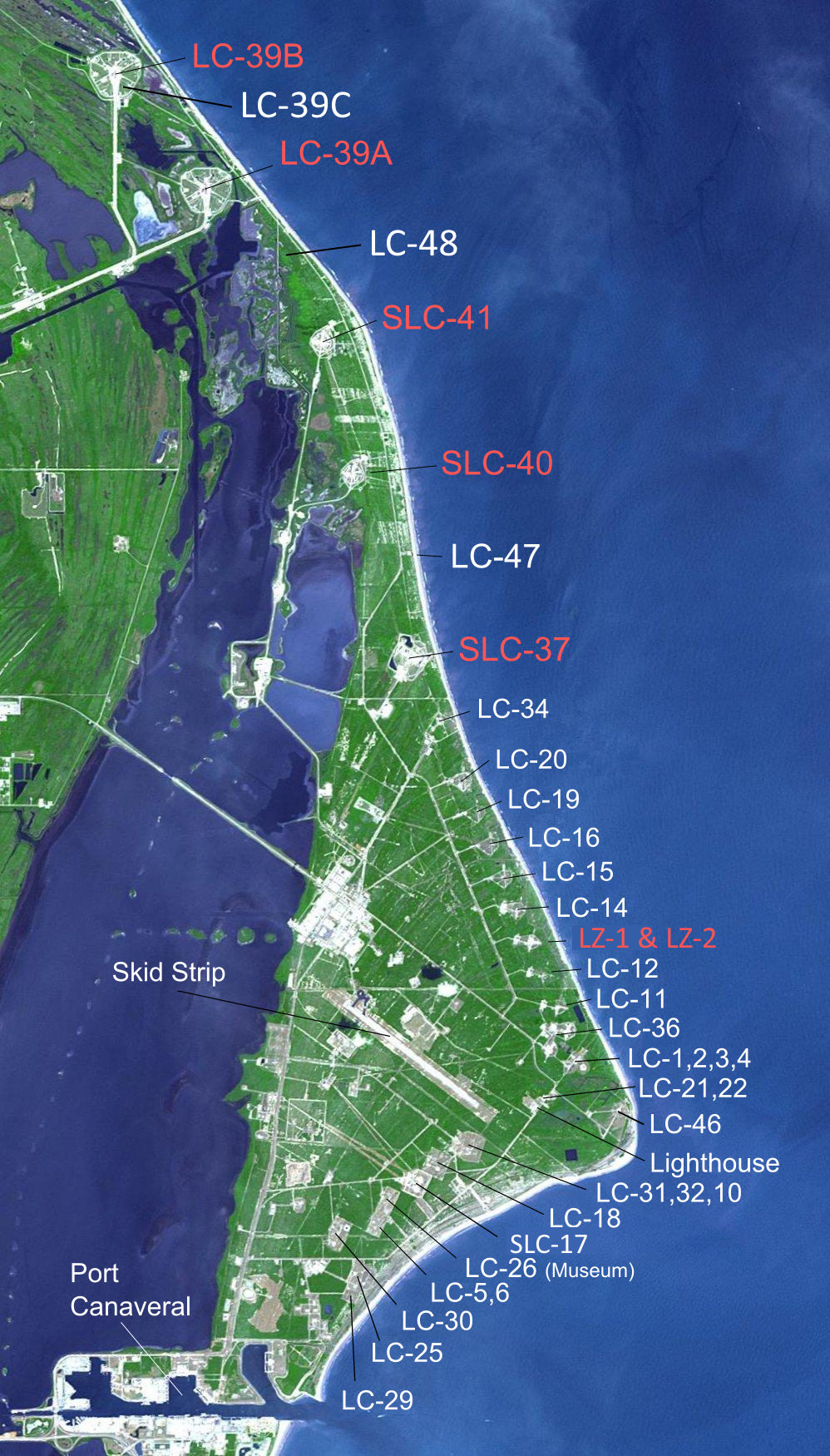
- A map of Cape Canaveral Air Force Station. LC-47 is the seventh complex labeled from the top
- Interactive map of Launch Complex 47
- Launch site: Cape Canaveral Space Force Station
- Location: 28.549123°N 80.5674339°W
- Time zone: UTC−05:00 (EST)
  - Summer (DST): UTC−04:00 (EDT)
- Short name: LC-47
- Operator: United States Space Force; NASA
- Total launches: 531
- Launch pad: 1
Launch history
- Status: Active
- First launch: 12 March 1984; Deacon (rocket) / Rocketsonde
- Last launch: 22 September 2008; Super Loki
- Associated rockets: Super Loki; Rocketsonde; Shadow 1; LOFT-1

Launch sites at Cape Canaveral Space Force Station and Kennedy Space Center
Active pads
Repurposed pads, not used for launches
Inactive leased pads
Inactive unleased pads
1 LC-39B
2 LC-39A
3 LC-48
4 SLC-41
5 SLC-40
6 LC-47
7 SLC-37
8 LC-34
9 SLC-20
10 LC-19
11 LC-16
12 LC-15
13 LC-14
14 LC-13 (LZ-2)
15 LC-12
16 LC-11
17 LC-36
18 LC-1, LC-2, LC-3, and LC-4
19 SLC-46
20 LC-21 and LC-22
21 LC-31 and LC-32
22 LC-18
23 SLC-17
24 LC-26
25 LC-5 and LC-6
26 LC-30
27 LC-25
28 LC-29

Cape Canaveral Launch Complex 47 (Launch Complex 47, LC-47) is a launch pad for sounding rockets located at the north end of Cape Canaveral Space Force Station, Florida. It is the smallest launch complex at the Space Force Station. The complex features a small blockhouse a few yards from the pad, containing vehicle-specific hardware. Between 1984 and 2008, 531 sounding rockets were launched from pad 47. All weather rocket operations were relocated here from Launch Complex 43 in 1984 in order to make room for the construction of Launch Complex 46.

The first launch at LC-47 occurred on March 12, 1984, with the flight of a Rocketsonde sounding rocket that reached an apogee of 63km. On October 14, 1991, a student sub-orbital launch on a Super Loki rocket occurred here. As of October 2017, the most recent launch from LC-47 was a Super Loki rocket that reached an apogee of 50km on September 22, 2008.

While originally slated for deactivation, on November 4, 2004, the 45th Space Wing transferred LC-47 to the Florida Space Authority under the Commercial Space Transportation Act allowing continued operations.

== Launch statistics ==
- Deacon
- Super Loki
