= Kennedy Space Center Launch Complex 48 =

Launch complex at Kennedy Space Center

Launch Complex 48
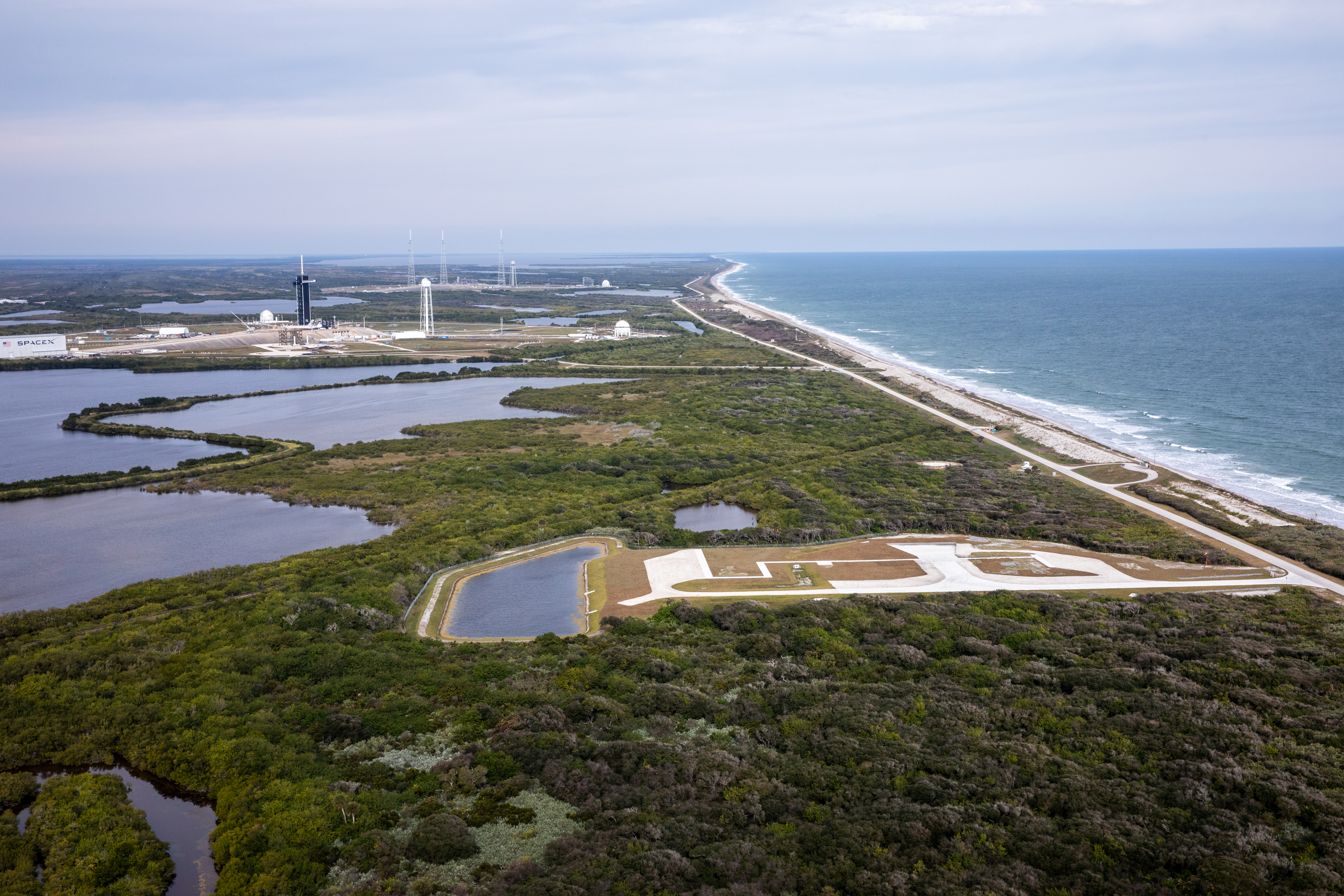
- Aerial view of KSC Launch Complex 48. Launch Complex 39 with its pads 39A and 39B are both visible behind the pad.
- Interactive map of Launch Complex 48
- Launch site: Kennedy Space Center
- Location: 28°35′56″N 80°35′20″W
- Time zone: UTC−5 (EST)
  - Summer (DST): UTC−4 (EDT)
- Short name: LC-48
- Established: October 2020
- Operator: NASA
- Launch pad: 1 (planned 2)
Launch history
- Status: Construction completed

Launch sites at Cape Canaveral Space Force Station and Kennedy Space Center
Active pads
Active pads not used for launches
Inactive leased pads
Inactive unleased pads
1 LC-39B
2 LC-39A
3 LC-48
4 SLC-41
5 SLC-40
6 LC-47
7 SLC-37
8 LC-34
9 SLC-20
10 LC-19
11 LC-16
12 LC-15
13 LC-14
14 LC-13 (LZ-2)
15 LC-12
16 LC-11
17 LC-36
18 LC-1, LC-2, LC-3, and LC-4
19 SLC-46
20 LC-21 and LC-22
21 LC-31 and LC-32
22 LC-18
23 SLC-17
24 LC-26
25 LC-5 and LC-6
26 LC-30
27 LC-25
28 LC-29

Launch Complex 48 (LC-48) is a multi-user launch site for small launchers and spacecraft. It is located south of Launch Complex 39A and north of Space Launch Complex 41.

The construction of LC-48 began in November 2019 but was halted in March 2020 due to the ongoing COVID-19 pandemic. Construction was resumed in June 2020, with the completion of the first pad in October 2020.

LC-48 is designed as a "clean pad" to support multiple launch systems with differing propellant needs. While initially only planned to have a single pad, the complex is capable of being expanded to two at a later date. With another pad constructed, LC-48 could support up to 104 launches per year, though actual usage is expected to be well below that.

NASA had previously constructed LC-39C within the bounds of LC-39B with the purpose of serving small launchers, but the operational constraints of sharing the site on a non-interference basis with both the Space Launch System and OmegA (now cancelled) launch vehicles, along with greater interest by commercial parties than originally anticipated, led NASA to pursue the construction of a dedicated launch site for this class of vehicles.

In October 2021 Astra announced they would begin launching Rocket from a second location besides Pacific Spaceport Complex – Alaska with SpaceNews reporting that LC-48 was the leading candidate. However, Astra instead selected SLC-46 as it already had pre-existing ground infrastructure.

As of November 2025, LC-48 has seen no launches, and none are currently planned from the complex.

== See also ==
- Rocket Lab Launch Complex 1
- List of Cape Canaveral and Merritt Island launch sites
- Pacific Spaceport Complex – Alaska
