= Cape Canaveral Launch Complex 32 =

United-Statian launch complex

Launch Complex 32
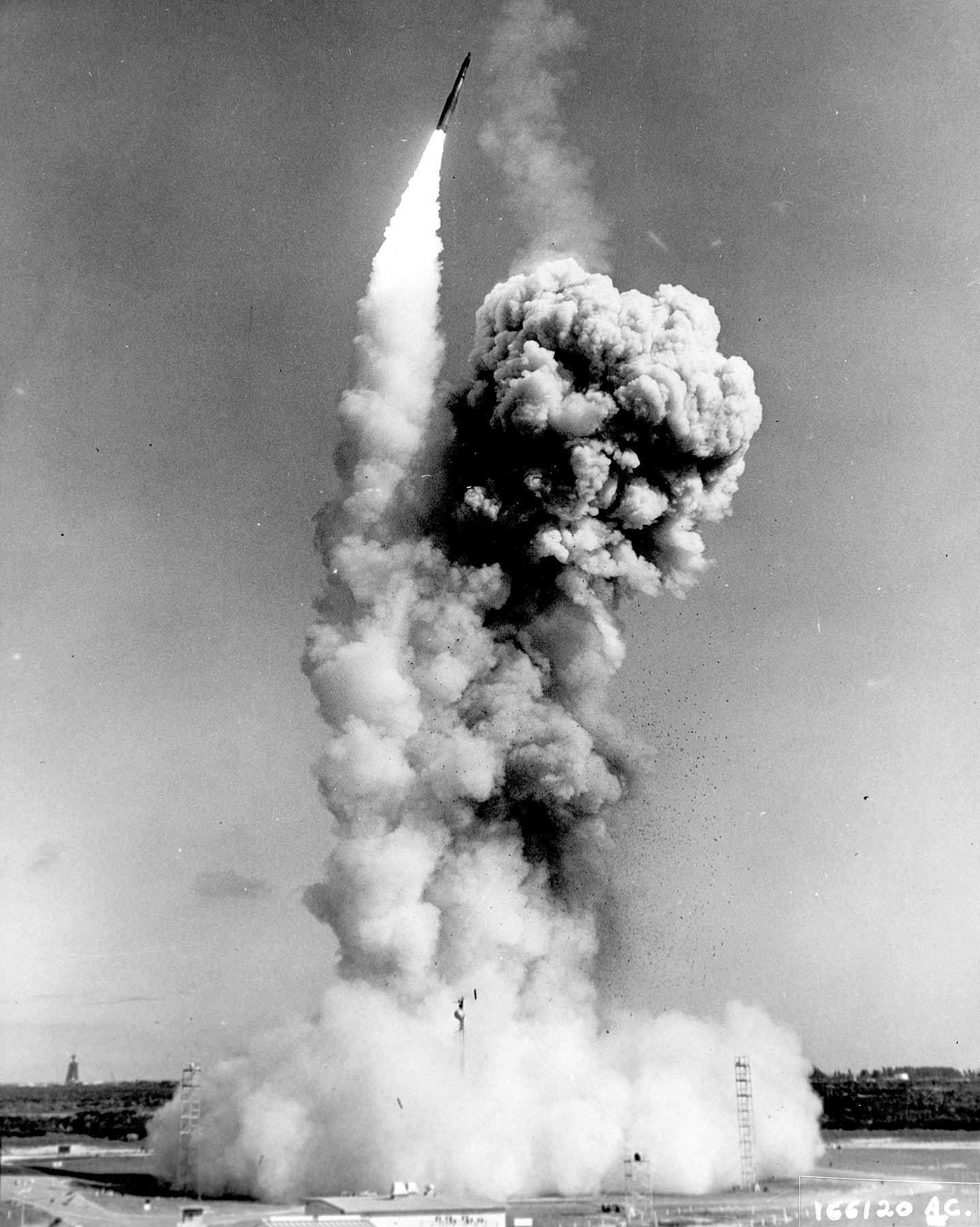
- An LGM-30 Minuteman launching from LC-32B in November 1961
- Interactive map of Launch Complex 32
- Launch site: Cape Canaveral Space Force Station
- Location: 28°27′09″N 80°33′22″W
- Time zone: UTC−05:00 (EST)
  - Summer (DST): UTC−04:00 (EDT)
- Short name: LC-32
- Operator: United States Space Force
- Launch pad: 2 (incl. silo)
Launch history
- Status: Inactive
- First launch: August 30, 1961
- Last launch: December 14, 1970
- Associated rockets: Minuteman

Launch sites at Cape Canaveral Space Force Station and Kennedy Space Center
Active pads
Repurposed pads, not used for launches
Inactive leased pads
Inactive unleased pads
1 LC-39B
2 LC-39A
3 LC-48
4 SLC-41
5 SLC-40
6 LC-47
7 SLC-37
8 LC-34
9 SLC-20
10 LC-19
11 LC-16
12 LC-15
13 LC-14
14 LC-13 (LZ-2)
15 LC-12
16 LC-11
17 LC-36
18 LC-1, LC-2, LC-3, and LC-4
19 SLC-46
20 LC-21 and LC-22
21 LC-31 and LC-32
22 LC-18
23 SLC-17
24 LC-26
25 LC-5 and LC-6
26 LC-30
27 LC-25
28 LC-29

Launch Complex 32 (LC-32) is a former launch complex at Cape Canaveral Space Force Station, Florida.

It was built in 1959 with LC-31 for the U.S. Air Force to conduct test launches of the first LGM-30 Minuteman missiles. These complexes were the first to feature dual launch pads, one of which was subterranean. LC-32 consisted of a blockhouse, static launch pad (32A) and missile silo (32B). The bee-hive-shaped blockhouse is 210 yards from the static pad and 330 yards from the silo.

The Air Force launched 53 ballistic missiles from the silo of LC-32B between August 30, 1961 and December 14, 1970. There are no records of any launches from the LC-32A launch pad.

The service tower has since been removed and silo filled in, although recovered debris from the space shuttle orbiter Challenger were buried in the silo as well as in the silo at Pad 31.
