= Cape Canaveral Launch Complex 31 =

Cape Canaveral Space Force Station launch site

Launch Complex 31
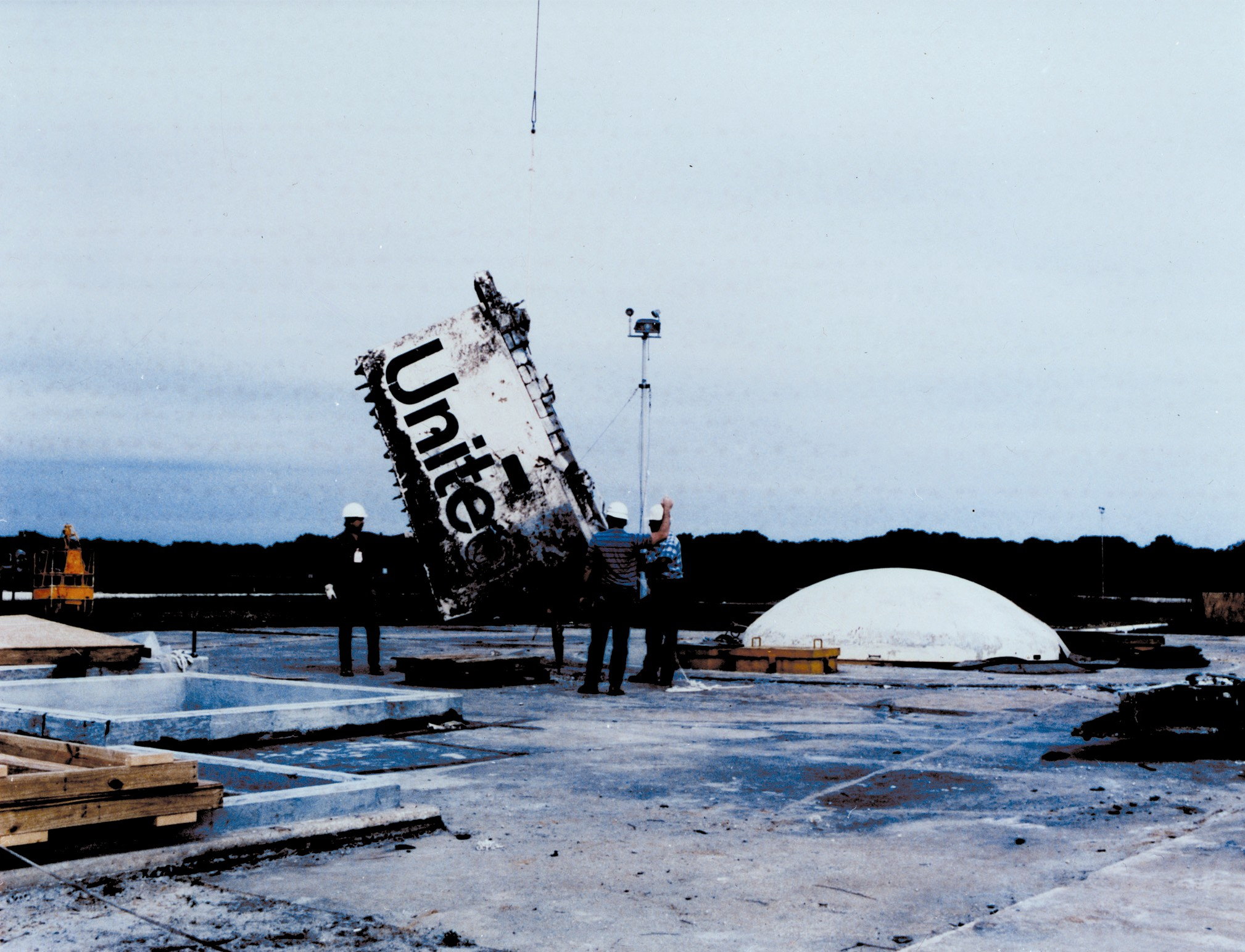
- The remains of Space Shuttle Challenger being lowered into silo at LC-31
- Interactive map of Launch Complex 31
- Launch site: Cape Canaveral Space Force Station
- Location: 28°27′09″N 80°33′22″W
- Time zone: UTC−05:00 (EST)
  - Summer (DST): UTC−04:00 (EDT)
- Short name: LC-31
- Operator: United States Space Force
- Total launches: 51
- Launch pad: 2 (incl. silo)
Pad 31A launch history
- Status: Inactive
- Launches: 16
- First launch: February 1, 1960; LGM-30A Minuteman I
- Last launch: March 19, 1973; Pershing 1a
- Associated rockets: Retired: LGM-30 Minuteman, LGM-31 Pershing
Pad 31B launch history
- Status: Inactive
- Launches: 35
- First launch: December 18, 1961; LGM-30A Minuteman I
- Last launch: September 23, 1969; LGM-30G Minuteman III
- Associated rockets: Retired: LGM-30 Minuteman

Launch sites at Cape Canaveral Space Force Station and Kennedy Space Center
Active pads
Inactive leased pads
Inactive unleased pads
Repurposed pads, not used for launches
1 LC-39B
2 LC-39A
3 LC-48
4 SLC-41
5 SLC-40
6 LC-47
7 SLC-37
8 LC-34
9 SLC-20
10 LC-19
11 LC-16
12 LC-15
13 LC-14
14 LC-13 (LZ-2)
15 LC-12
16 LC-11
17 LC-36
18 LC-1, LC-2, LC-3, and LC-4
19 SLC-46
20 LC-21 and LC-22
21 LC-31 and LC-32
22 LC-18
23 SLC-17
24 LC-26
25 LC-5 and LC-6
26 LC-30
27 LC-25
28 LC-29

Launch Complex 31 (LC-31) is a former launch complex at Cape Canaveral Space Force Station, Florida.

It was built in 1959 with LC-32 for the U.S. Air Force to conduct test launches of the first LGM-30 Minuteman missiles. LC-31 was built next to Navaho complex LC-9, requiring LC-10 to be demolished. These complexes were the first to feature dual launch pads, one of which was subterranean. LC-31 consisted of a blockhouse, static launch pad (31A) and missile silo (31B). The beehive-shaped blockhouse is 210 yards from the static pad and 330 yards from the silo.

Between February 1, 1960 and September 23, 1969 the Air Force launched a total of four Minuteman missiles from pad 31A and 35 from silo 31B. Pad 31A was used later by the U.S. Army to test launch twelve Pershing 1a missiles.

The service tower has since been removed; the silo remains, and contains recovered debris from the Space Shuttle orbiter vehicle Challenger, along with the recovered remains of satellites TDRS-B and Spartan Halley, which were onboard Challenger when she disintegrated 73 seconds after launch.

== 2015 opening of the silo ==
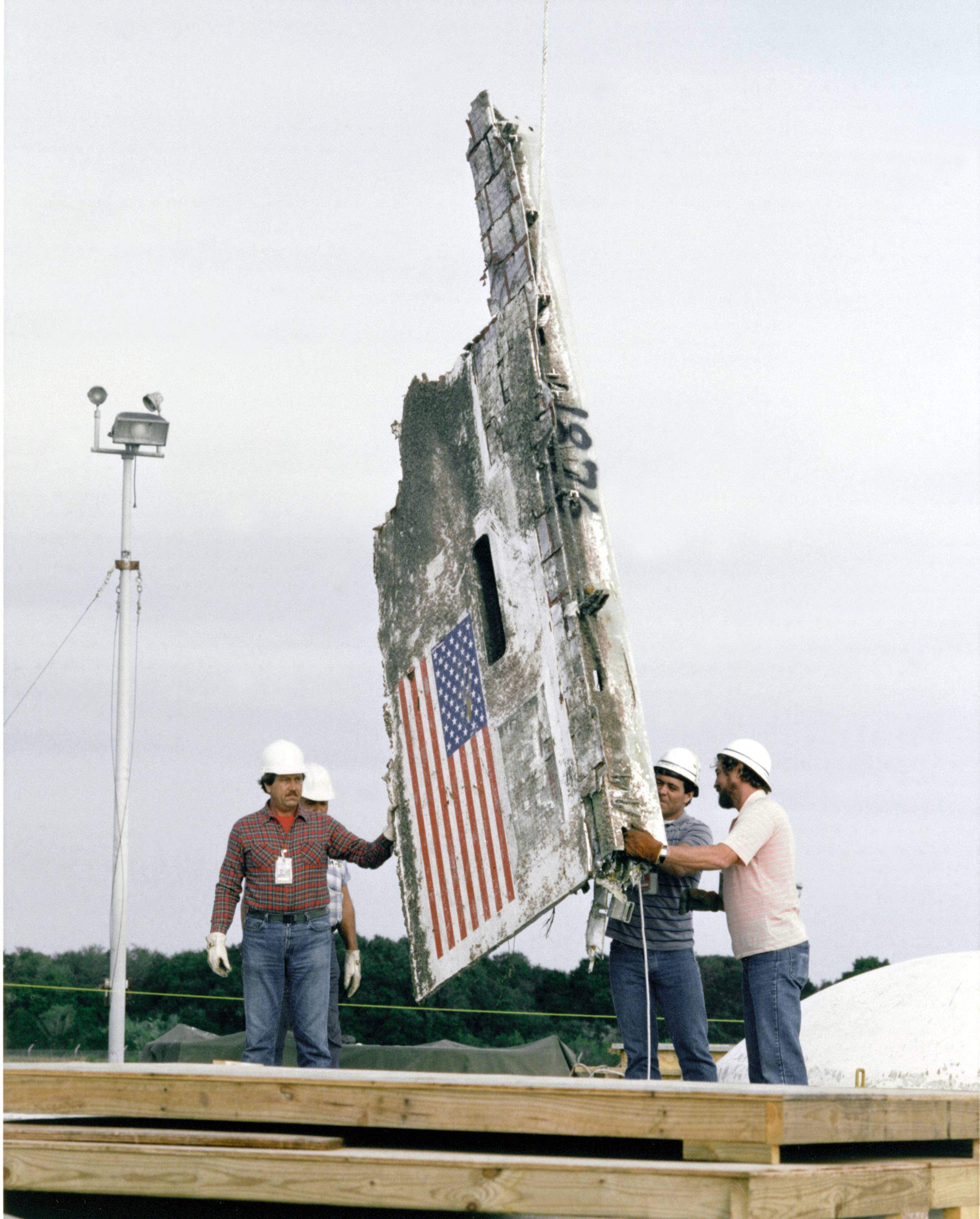
A piece of Space Shuttle Challenger being lowered into silo at LC-31. This exact piece was later removed and is now display at the Kennedy Space Center Visitor Complex.

In 2015, NASA opened the silo and removed several pieces of Challenger's debris, so they could be placed on permanent display at the Kennedy Space Center Visitor Complex.
