= Cape Canaveral Launch Complex 6 =

Launch site in Florida

Launch Complex 6
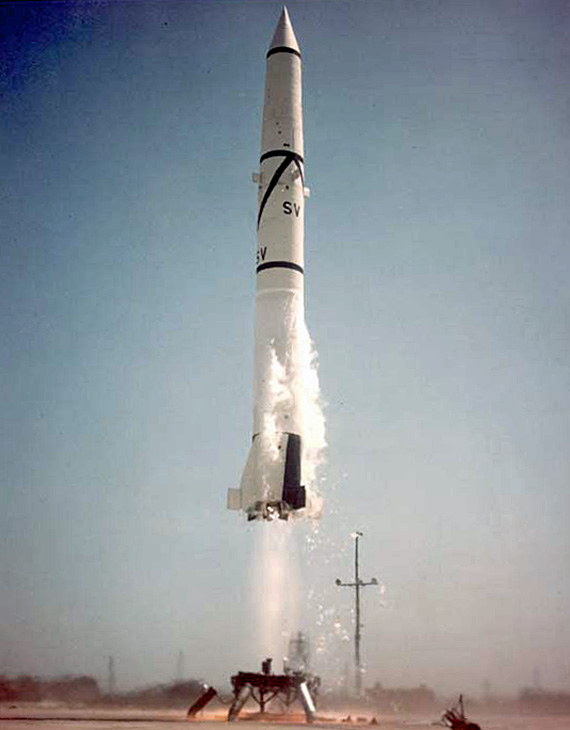
- A PGM-11 Redstone launches from LC-6 in September 1958
- Interactive map of Launch Complex 6
- Launch site: Cape Canaveral Space Force Station
- Location: 28°26′27″N 80°34′22″W
- Time zone: UTC−05:00 (EST)
  - Summer (DST): UTC−04:00 (EDT)
- Short name: LC-6
- Operator: US Army (ABMA)
- Total launches: 43
- Launch pad: 1
Launch history
- Status: Inactive
- First launch: Redstone 7; 20 April 1955
- Last launch: Redstone Training #23; 27 June 1961
- Associated rockets: PGM-11 Redstone; PGM-19 Jupiter; Jupiter-A; Jupiter-C

Launch sites at Cape Canaveral Space Force Station and Kennedy Space Center
Active pads
Repurposed pads, not used for launches
Inactive leased pads
Inactive unleased pads
1 LC-39B
2 LC-39A
3 LC-48
4 SLC-41
5 SLC-40
6 LC-47
7 SLC-37
8 LC-34
9 SLC-20
10 LC-19
11 LC-16
12 LC-15
13 LC-14
14 LC-13 (LZ-2)
15 LC-12
16 LC-11
17 LC-36
18 LC-1, LC-2, LC-3, and LC-4
19 SLC-46
20 LC-21 and LC-22
21 LC-31 and LC-32
22 LC-18
23 SLC-17
24 LC-26
25 LC-5 and LC-6
26 LC-30
27 LC-25
28 LC-29

Launch Complex 6 (LC-6) at Cape Canaveral Space Force Station, Florida is a launch site used by Redstone and Jupiter series rockets and missiles. It is on the south end of Cape Canaveral, close to Launch Complex 5, with which it shared a blockhouse. With LC-5, it was the location of the first tests of the mobile launch concept designed by Kurt H. Debus. This concept was revised and improved and eventually used at LC-39 for the Saturn V and Space Shuttle.

LC-6 was deactivated in 1961. The blockhouse and a 61.96 m (203.3 ft) square concrete pad are the only parts of the complex that remain intact, although the mobile service tower was under restoration as of 2011. The complex is part of the "Cape Canaveral: Then and Now" tour, available from the Kennedy Space Center Visitor Complex.

== Gallery ==
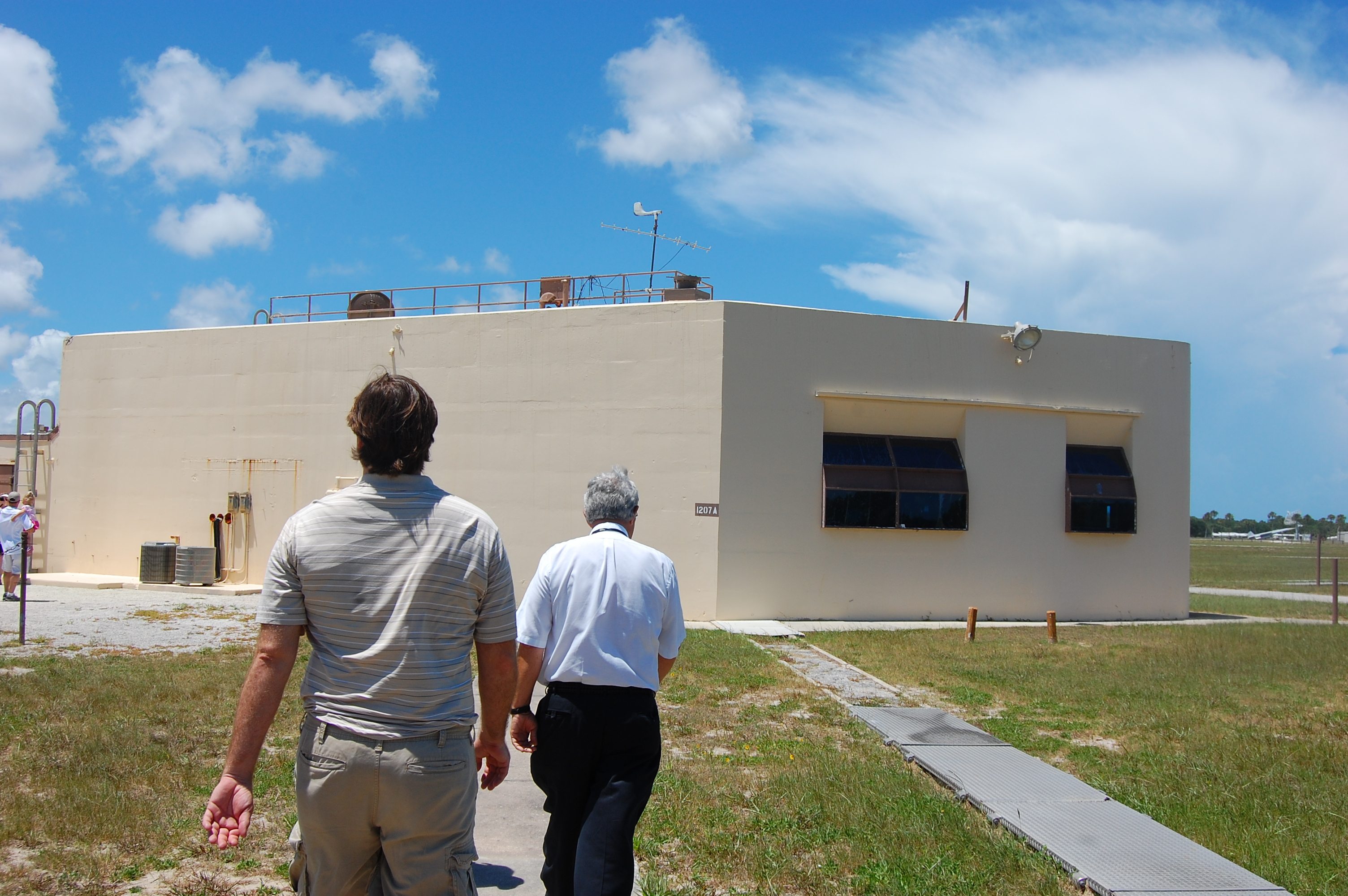
Blockhouse (2010)

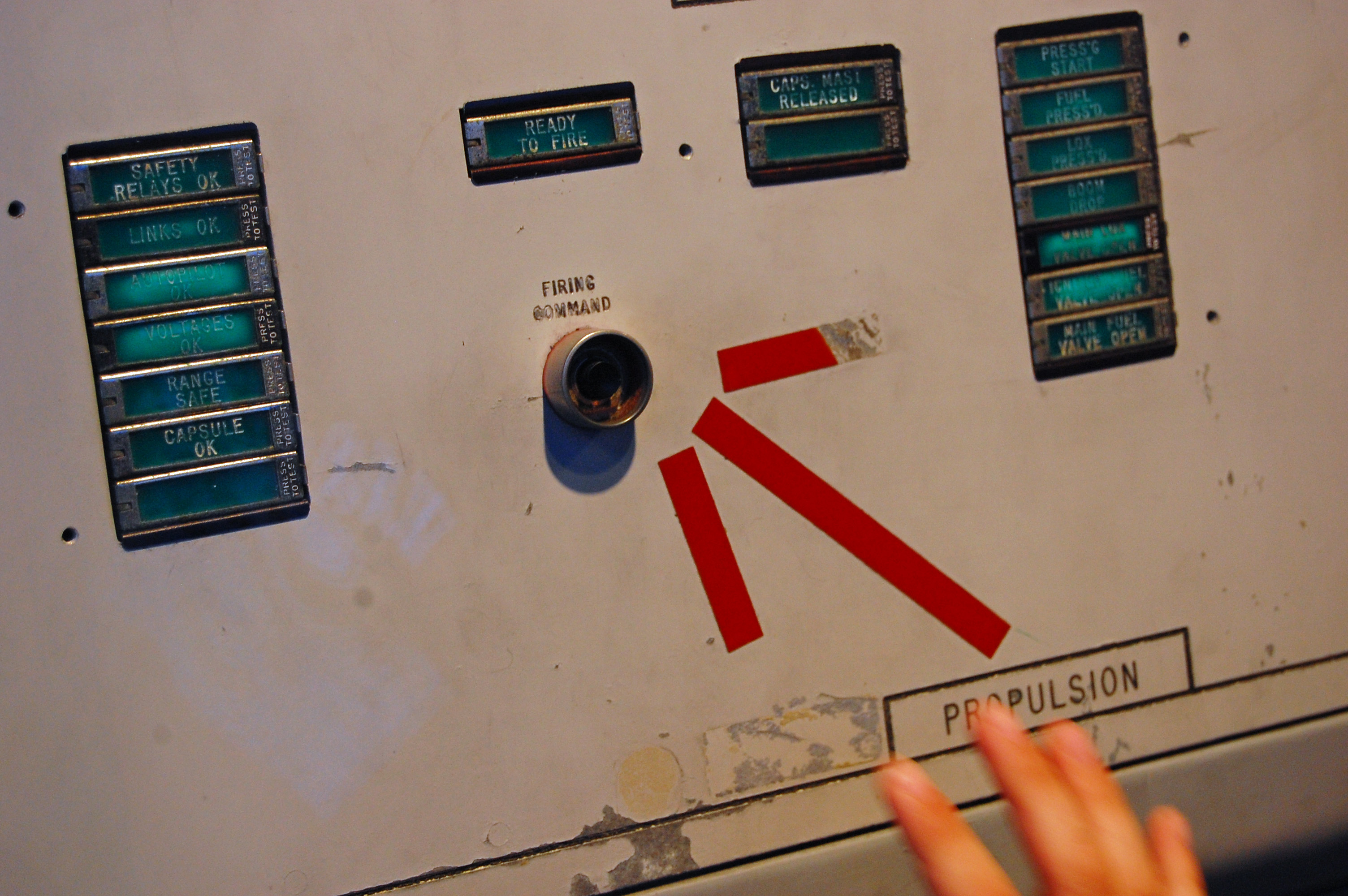
Firing button (2010)

== See also ==
- Cape Canaveral
- Cape Canaveral Launch Complex 5 - used the same blockhouse
