= Atlas Systems =

Atlas Systems may refer to:

- 6555th Aerospace Test Group, a United States Air Force unit that had an "Atlas Systems" division in 1971
- Shortages in Venezuela, which mentions a Panama-based company named Atlas Systems in a food-import corruption case

== See also ==
- Atlas (disambiguation)
- Atlassian, an Australian software company
- Atlas Elektronik, a German naval and marine electronics and systems company
- Atlas Solutions, a former online advertising subsidiary of Meta Platforms
- Atlas Consortium, a group of technology companies
