= Defence Information Infrastructure =

Defence Information Infrastructure (DII) is a secure military network owned by the United Kingdom's Ministry of Defence MOD. It is used by all branches of the armed forces, including the Royal Navy, British Army and Royal Air Force as well as MOD civil servants. It reaches to deployed bases and ships at sea, but not to aircraft in flight.

In 2000, the MOD began to plan the systems replacement project. In March 2005, the MOD gave a contract to the Atlas Consortium, with EDS as prime contractor, for installation and management over 10 years. That has developed into a consortium made up of DXC Technology (formerly EDS), Fujitsu, Airbus Defence and Space (formerly EADS Defence & Security) and CGI (formerly Logica).

Starting in May 2016, MOD users of DII begin to migrate to the New Style of IT within the defence to be known as MODNET; again supported by ATLAS.

== Overview ==
DII supports 2,000 MOD sites with some 150,000 terminals (desktops and laptops) and 300,000 user accounts. It is designed to offer a high level of resilience, flexibility, and security in the provision of connectivity from ‘business space to battlespace’ in MOD offices in the UK, bases overseas, at sea, and on the front line. It aims to rationalise and improve IT provision for the defence sector in the 21st century; involving a major culture change for MOD users and their ways of working through a structure of shared working areas with controlled security and access. It should provide a records management system and search facility together with a range of office services. It hosts several hundred COTS (commercial off-the-shelf) and bespoke MOD applications from a range of suppliers judged to meet the required security standards. The network handles alphanumeric data, graphics, and video. The system carries information from Restricted to above-Secret levels, but users are able to see only the data and applications for which they are authorised.

== Incremental approach ==
In order to de-risk the programme Atlas and the MOD took an incremental approach to the development and implementation of DII, with a separate contract for each increment. The extended timeline allowed the MOD flexibility in defining its requirements.

- Increment 1: Contract awarded March 2005. This covered 70,000 user access devices (UADs) and 200,000 user accounts in the Restricted and Secret domains in 680 fixed locations.
- Increment 2a: Contract awarded December 2006. This was for an additional 44,000 UADs and 58,000 user accounts in the Restricted and Secret domains, again in fixed locations.
- Increment 2b: Contract awarded September 2007: This extended DII(F) into the deployed environment with the provision of UADs to support land and maritime deployed operations.
- Increment 2c: Signed in January 2009. This extended the DII footprint into the above-Secret domain to support a number of key operations and intelligence initiatives.
- Increment 3a: Contract awarded January 2010. Atlas provided 42,000 UADs operating in the Restricted and Secret domains to the remaining MOD fixed sites. This supported some 60,000 personnel, notably within the RAF, at Joint Helicopter Command and other MOD locations. Increment 3a received an MOD Chief of Defence Materiel commendation.

== Costs and transparency ==
The Ministry of Defence informed Parliament the system would cost £2.3bn, even though it knew the cost would be at least £5.8bn.

By 2008 the programme was running at least 18 months late; had delivered only 29,000 of a contracted 63,000 terminals; and had delivered none of the contracted Secret capability.

In January 2010 the Parliamentary Under-Secretary of State for Defence announced that the Ministry of Defence had authorised DII increment 3a at a cost of around £540 million to provide 42,000 terminals within the RAF and at Joint Helicopter Command. He stated that the project would deliver "benefits" worth over £1.6 billion over the 10 years of the contract. That year the project was scheduled to cost at least £7bn, however, the UK government said it might attempt to reduce this sum.

By 2014 the rollout of all UK terminals was complete and a refresh of the original desktops and printers to new hardware underway. The overseas rollout was coming to an end and well over half the fleet, including aircraft carrier HMS Queen Elizabeth, equipped. The final part of Secret capability deployment was scheduled to complete in summer of 2014.
