= Atlas Consortium =

- Industry: Information technology
- Products: Information technology services

The Atlas Consortium (stylized as 'ATLAS') comprises four partner companies; DXC Technology, Fujitsu, Airbus Defence and Space and CGI. Each Atlas partner has extensive experience of major technology implementation programmes in both the public and private sectors. Some 3,000 IT professionals have worked on the development and delivery of the ATLAS programme.

The consortium is tasked with developing Defence Information Infrastructure (DII) which is a secure military network for the MoD (United Kingdom's Ministry of Defence). This is the largest, most complex information infrastructure rolled out in Europe and connects 300,000 users and 150,000 terminals in 2,000 MoD locations around the world. DII provides a range of software enabling collaborative working across geographical and organisational boundaries and hosts several hundred MoD applications from a range of suppliers, all designed to meet exacting security standards.

It provides connectivity from 'business space to battlespace' in MoD offices in the UK, bases overseas or deployed at sea or on the front line. This demands a high level of resilience, flexibility and security.
