= 6555th Aerospace Test Group =

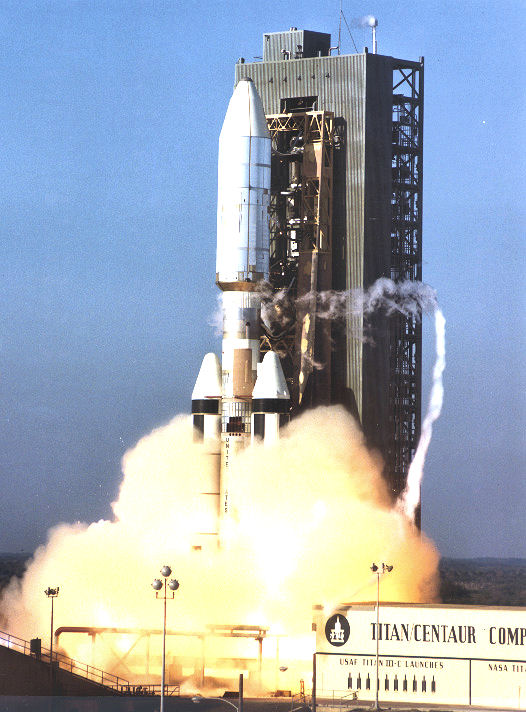
- Titan IIIE 23E-6/Centaur D-1T E-6 launches Voyager 1 from LC-41 at Cape Canaveral Air Force Station, 5 September 1977
- Active: 1950–1990
- Country: United States
- Branch: United States Air Force
- Role: Test of aerospace vehicles
- Decorations: Air Force Outstanding Unit Award

Insignia
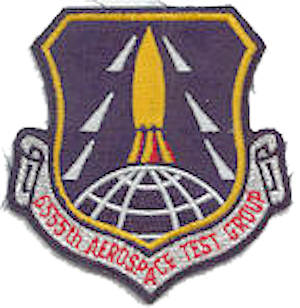
- 6555th Aerospace Test Group emblem

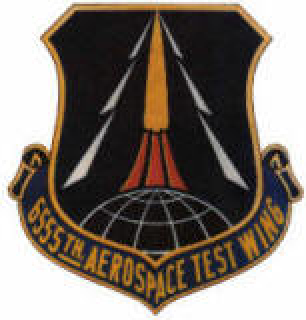
- 6555th Aerospace Test Wing emblem

The 6555th Aerospace Test Group is an inactive United States Air Force unit. It was last assigned to the Eastern Space and Missile Center and stationed at Patrick Air Force Base, Florida. It was inactivated on 1 October 1990.

Prior to the activation of the Air Force Space Command, the unit was responsible for the development of USAF missiles, both tactical surface-to-surface; CIM-10 Bomarc Interceptor Missile; SM-62 Snark Intercontinental Cruise Missile; Intercontinental ballistic missile and heavy launch rockets used for military for satellite deployment. The unit played a key role in the civilian NASA Project Mercury, Project Gemini and Project Apollo crewed space programs along with military Space Shuttle flights.

In 2025, launching and managing such missiles is performed by Space Launch Delta 45, which has no direct lineage link to the group.

== History ==
Activated in December 1950, replacing 550th Guided Missiles Wing. The group had a distinguished career launching and/or managing ballistic missiles, space launch vehicles and payloads for the Ballistic Systems Division, the Space Systems Division and the Space & Missile Systems Organization. As a Wing or a Group, the 6555th earned ten Air Force Outstanding Unit Awards between 21 December 1959 and October 1990.

In the 1950s, the unit had several designation changes and organizational realignments. As launches of winged missiles continued, the Wing gained two new units the 1st and 69th Pilotless Bomber Squadrons in October 1951 and January 1952. Thereafter, the 6555th focused most of its efforts on assembling, testing and launching B-61 Matador missiles so the 1st and 69th Pilotless Bomber Squadrons would be prepared for operations in Europe. The 6555th Guided Missile Wing became the 6555th Guided Missile Group on 1 March 1953, and the 1st and 69th Pilotless Bomber Squadrons were reassigned to Tactical Air Command (TAC) on 15 January 1954. Since TAC agreed to train all other B-61 Matador squadrons at TAC's own school at Orlando AFB, Florida, the 6555th Guided Missile Group was little more than a squadron when the 69th completed its field training in the summer of 1954.

The 6555th Guided Missile Group was discontinued on 7 September 1954. The 6555th Guided Missile Squadron was allowed to survive as a B-61 Matador research and development testing unit, and it was reassigned to AFMTC Headquarters on 7 September 1954. The 6555th Guided Missiles Squadron became the 6555th Guided Missile Group (Test and Evaluation) on 15 August 1959, and it was reassigned to the Air Force Ballistic Missile Division (without any change of station) on 21 December 1959. Concurrent with its reassignment, the Group picked up the resources of the Air Force Ballistic Missile Division's Assistant Commander for Missile Tests.

At the beginning of 1971, the 6555th Aerospace Test Group consisted of a commander's office and three divisions (e.g., Support, Atlas Systems and Titan III Systems). Though the Test Group's launch operations revolved around the Atlas and Titan III systems divisions in the early 1970s, the Group established its Space Transportation System (STS) Division on 1 July 1974 to ensure the Defense Department's Shuttle requirements were factored into future Shuttle operations at the Kennedy Space Center (KSC).

On 1 November 1975, the Test Group reorganized its Atlas and Titan III launch vehicle agencies under a new division, the Space Launch Vehicle Systems Division. On the same date, the Atlas Satellite Launch Systems Branch and the Titan III Space Satellite Systems Launch Operations Branch were consolidated under the newly created Satellite Systems Division. The changes were directed by the 6595th Aerospace Test Wing Commander to combine booster operations under one division chief and payload operations under another division chief. In the same vein, the IUS Operations Branch was placed under the Space Launch Vehicle Systems Division when that branch was formed on 1 July 1977. Following the final Atlas-Agena launch on 6 April 1978, the Space Launch Vehicle Systems Division and the Satellite Systems Division shifted their respective attentions from Atlas-Agena operations on Complex 13 to Atlas-Centaur boosters and payloads designated for Defense Department missions on Complex 36.

On 1 October 1979, the Group was transferred to the 45th Space Wing's immediate predecessor, the Eastern Space and Missile Center (ESMC). The unit was inactivated on 1 October 1990 when Air Force Space Command inactivated the provisional unit and merged the organization with ESMC. Most of the 6555th's resources were reorganized as the 1st Space Launch Squadron under ESMC and two Combined Task Forces (CTFs) serving AFSPC and Air Force Systems Command.

Ultimately, the last vestiges of the 6555th were inactivated on 1 July 1992 as Air Force Systems Command and Air Force Logistics Command merged to form Air Force Materiel Command. By 2006, the mission of the unit was performed by the 45th Operations Group and the 45th Launch Group components of the 45th Space Wing.

=== Weapons and missile development ===
==== Postwar era ====
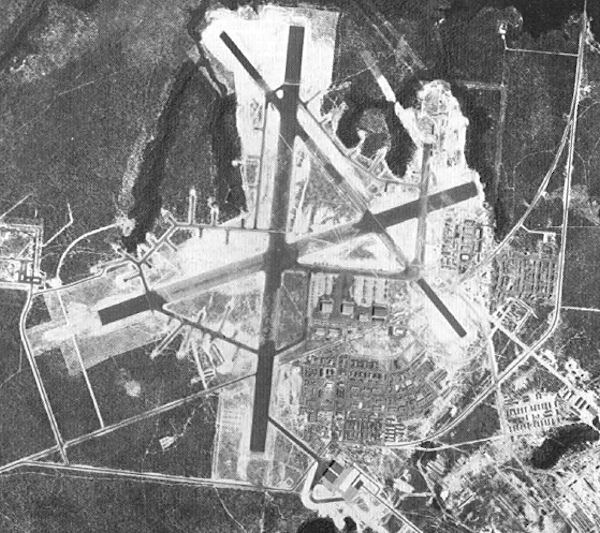
Army Air Forces Proving Ground – Eglin Field, 1946

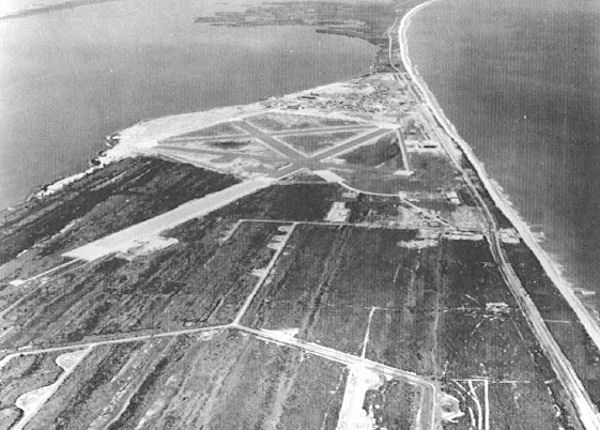
Joint Long Range Proving Ground AFB, 1950

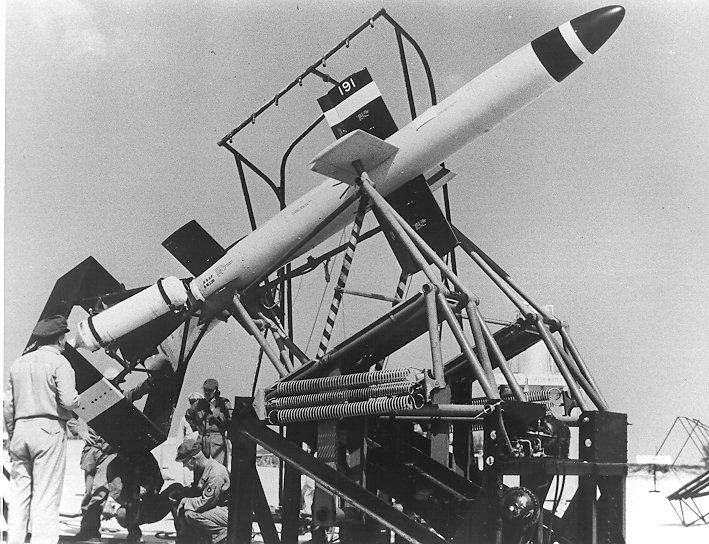
Navy Lark Missile being tested, 1950

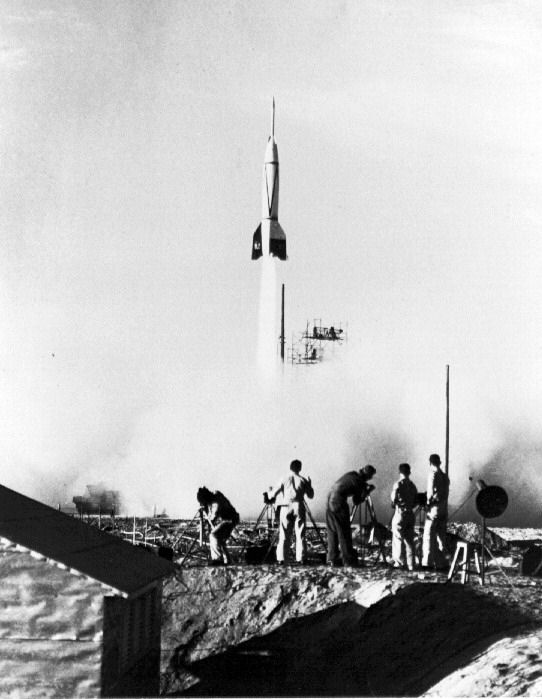
"Bumper 7" V-2 test 29 July 1950, the launch of the first rocket from Cape Canaveral, Florida

Between 1946 and 1950, the Group's predecessor units, the 1st Experimental Guided Missiles Group and 550th Guided Missiles Wing, tested a variety of glided bombs and tactical missiles. They also developed QB-17 drone aircraft for use in atomic bomb testing, and later as targets for anti-aircraft missiles. The 550th GMW also launched the first rockets from the Joint Long Range Proving Ground at Cape Canaveral, Florida in 1950.

- Republic-Ford JB-2 (1947–1949)

The JB-2 was a U.S.-made copy of the famous German V-1 surface-to-surface, pilotless flying bomb first used against England in June 1944. Planned for use in the Invasion of Japan, the missile was never used in combat during World War II. The 1st Experimental Guided Missiles Group began a testing program with the JB-2 at White Sands, New Mexico in March 1947 and it spent several months preparing a detachment to depart for cold weather testing of the JB-2 in Alaska in November 1948. Testing was also done at the Army Air Forces Proving Ground at Santa Rosa Island, Florida. The JB-2 was never used operationally, however it led to the development of the first operational USAF cruise missile, the Martin B-61A Matador.

- QB-17L Flying Fortress (1946–1950)

The BQ-17 Flying Fortresses was an unmanned aircraft that would fly near or even through mushroom clouds during postwar atomic tests. B-17s were withdrawn from stores for conversion into drones with the addition of radio, radar, television, and other equipment. Most of the work was performed by the San Antonio Air Depot at Kelly Field in Texas. Initially supplied by the 1st Experimental Guided Missiles Group, The first of these nuclear tests took place in the South Pacific under the code name "Operation Crossroads". When the USAF was established in 1947, the director aircraft became DB-17Gs, while the drones became QB-17GL.

By January 1950, the Air Proving Ground decided this piecemeal operation ought to be consolidated, and it recommended the establishment of a separate and permanent drone squadron. Personnel from the 550th GMW 2d Guided Missiles Squadron were subsequently transferred to a new unit, the 3200th Proof Test Group in May 1950. When the 550th GMW was reassigned to Patrick AFB in December 1950, the drone operations remained at the Eglin's Air Proving Ground Center.

- VB-6 Felix (1947–1948)

The Felix was an air-to-surface guided bomb equipped with a heat-seeking guidance system primarily designed as an anti-ship weapon. Developed during World War II, Successful trials led to the Felix being put into production in 1945, but the Pacific War ended before it entered combat. Testing on the weapon was conducted between 1947–1948 at Eglin Field by the 1st Experimental Guided Missiles Squadron

- VB-3 Razon (1947–1948)

The VB-3 Razon (for range and azimuth) was a standard 1,000-pound general-purpose bomb fitted with flight control surfaces. Development of the Razon began in 1942, but it did not see use during World War II. Tested during the postwar era, by the 1st Experimental Guided Missiles Squadron, at Eglin Field.

The Razon was used by the 19th Bombardment Group B-29s during the Korean War, the first in August 1950. The squadron dropped 489 Razons, and about one-third of those dropped did not respond to radio control. Despite these difficulties, B-29 bombardiers destroyed 15 bridges with Razon bombs.

- VB-13 Tarzon (1947–1948)

Developed in 1946, the Tarzon was essentially a British 12,000-pound "Tall Boy" bomb fitted with a forward shroud to provide lift, with flight control surfaces in the tail. The name came from a combination of Tall Boy and Razon. Tested during the postwar era, by the 1st Experimental Guided Missiles Squadron, at Eglin Field.

The first Tarzon attack in Korea took place in December 1950, and by the end of January, 19th Bombardment Group B-29s had cut spans out of four bridges. Tarzons remained in short supply, however, and after a B-29 was believed lost attempting to jettison one, the Air Force canceled the Tarzon in August 1951. 30 were dropped, 1 hit their targets, destroying six bridges and damaging another.

- Lark Missile (1949–1953)

Development began in 1944; the Lark was an early United States Navy surface-to-air, liquid-propellant, rocket-propelled missile built by the Consolidated-Vultee Aircraft Corporation, and was usually launched from the decks of ships with the help of solid propellant boosters. It carried a 100-pound warhead and had a range of about 38 miles. Also tested by the Air Force 550th GMW 3d Guided Missiles Squadron at Navy Point Mugu Testing Range, California. Also tested by the 4800th GMW 4803d GMS at the Long Range Proving Ground, Florida.

- German V-2/WAC-Corporal (1950)

Most tests of captured V-2 rockets were conducted at White Sands, New Mexico, however the "Bumper7 and Bumper8" tests were launched from Cape Canaveral on 24 and 29 July 1950 respectively. The General Electric Company was responsible for launching the vehicles, and the Army's Ballistic Research Laboratories (Aberdeen Proving Ground, Maryland) provided instrumentation support. Among the Army and Air Force units that supported the Bumper flights from the Cape, the 550th Guided Missiles Wing provided several aircraft and crews to monitor the Range for clearance purposes. The Long Range Proving Ground Division provided overall coordination and range clearance.

- AIM-4 Falcon (1952)

The Falcon was the first operational guided air-to-air missile of the U.S. Air Force. The missile was developed through a series of prototypes (e.g., models "A" through "F"). On 31 March 1952, the 6556th Guided Missile Squadron established a Falcon cadre at Holloman Air Force Base and Falcon model "C" and "D" missiles were fired against bomber drones during 1952.

- GAM-63 Rascal (1951–1952)

The GAM-63 was an air-to-surface supersonic guided missile armed with a nuclear warhead. Its development was inaugurated in April 1946. The Rascal was intended as a "stand off" weapon, to be launched from Strategic Air Command (SAC) bombers as far away as 100 miles, thus reducing the manned bomber crew's exposure to enemy defenses in the immediate target area.

A 2/3-scale version of the GAM-63 Rascal called "Shrike" was tested at Holloman AFB in 1951 and 1952 by the 6556th Guided Missile Squadron to evaluate the aerodynamics and launching characteristics of the Rascal system. Though there was some thought given to transferring the Rascal program to the Patrick AFB Air Force Missile and Testing Center in 1952, Headquarters ARDC decided to keep the Rascal at Holloman AFB along with shorter-ranged missile programs.

==== Aerodynamic missiles ====
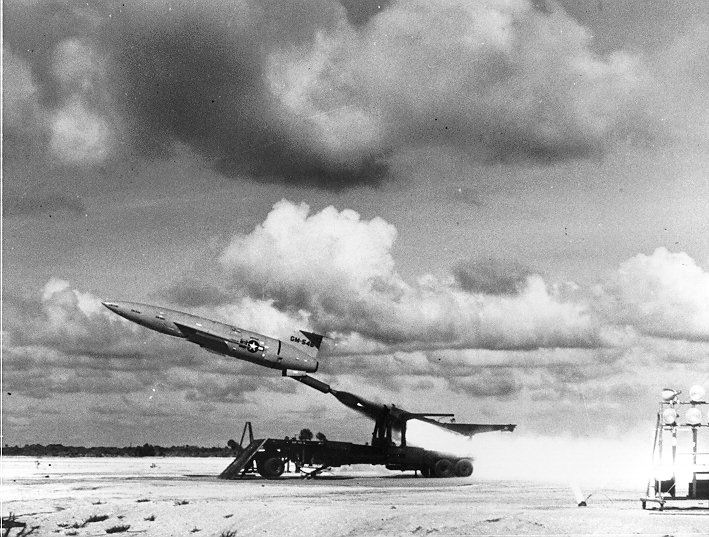
B-61A Matador Launch From Cape Canaveral 18 July 1951

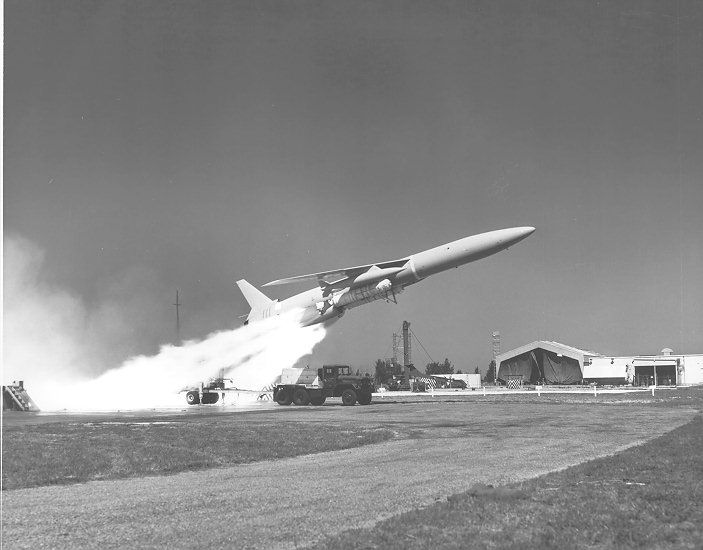
SM-62 Snark test launch – 1962

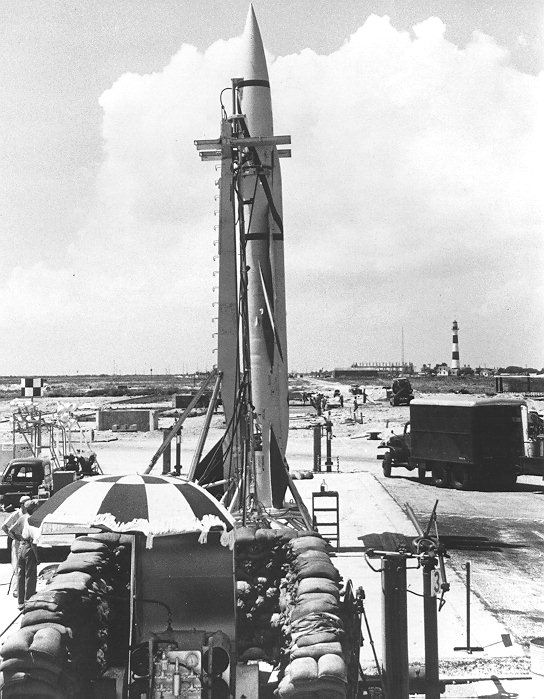
First IM-99 Bomarc on Launch Pad 4, August 1952

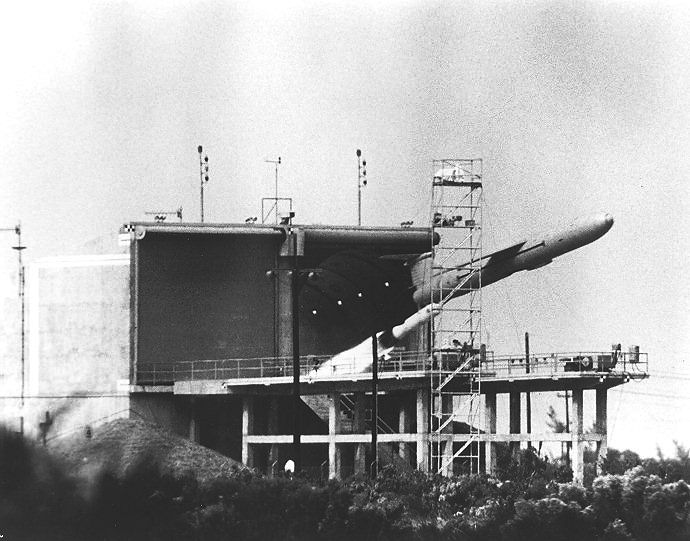
TM-76B Mace missile test by the 6555th, Pad 21 15 November 1960

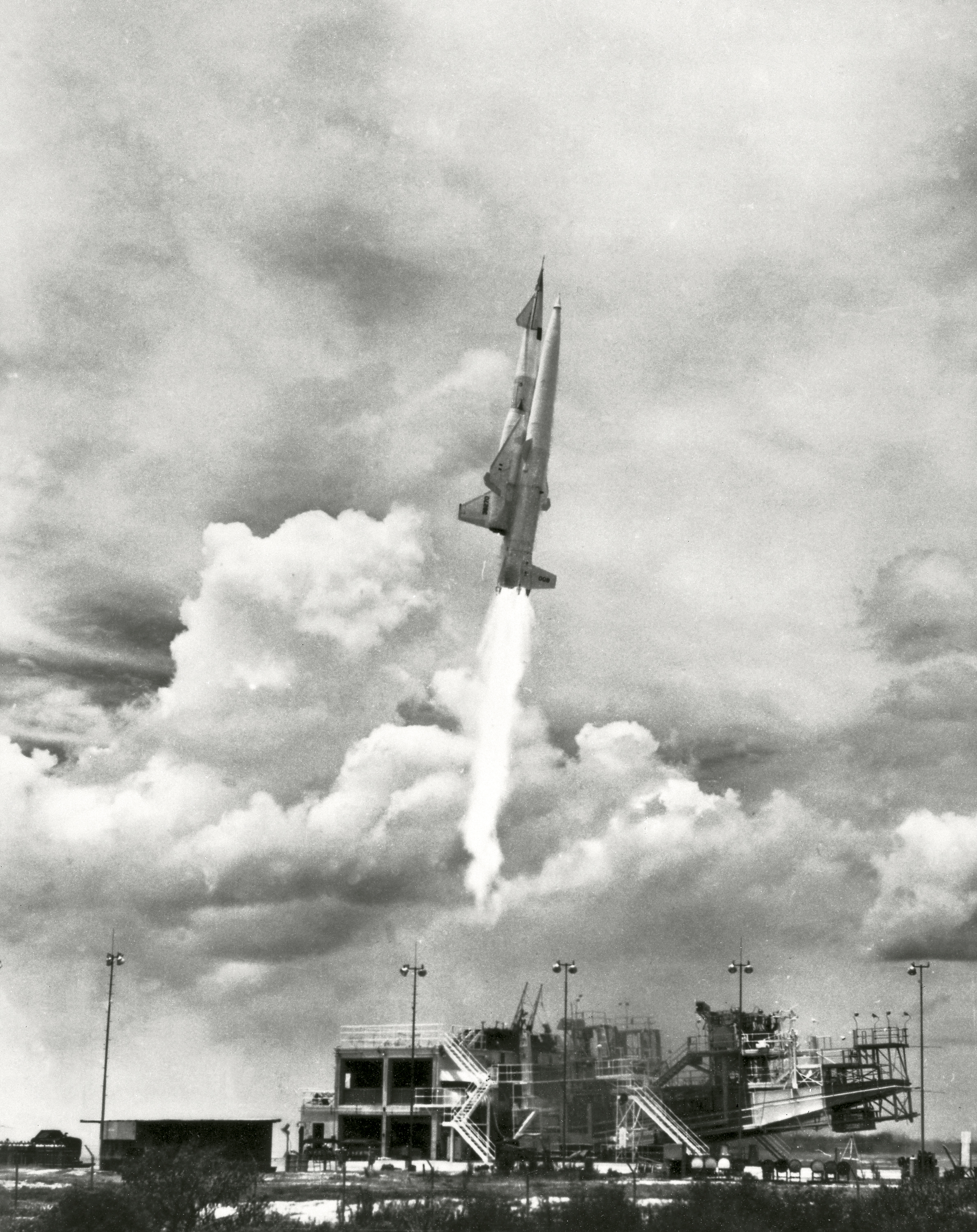
XSM-64 Navaho launch from LC-9, 1957

Aerodynamic or "winged" missile testing dominated the activities of the 6555th for most of the 1950s. The decade witnessed the introduction of the B-61 Matador, SM-62 Snark, IM-99 Bomarc, XSM-64 Navaho and TM-76 Mace aerodynamic missiles, among which the Matador, with over 280 launches to its credit, stood out as the most-launched missile of its era. The Matador was also the 6555th's first full-fledged weapon system program and its initial deployment overseas included military launch crews trained at Cape Canaveral AFS.

- B-61A Matador, (1951–1954)

The Matador was a surface-to-surface tactical missile designed to carry a conventional or nuclear warhead. Originally designated as the B-61, the USAF's first "pilotless bomber," it was similar in concept to the German V-1 (Buzz Bomb) of World War II, and developed from the United States JB-2 copy of the V-1. The XB-61 was first launched on 19 January 1949. Operational TM-61s, which later followed, were the first tactical guided missiles in the USAF inventory. The 1st Pilotless Bomber Squadron (Light) was organized in October 1951 for test and training purposes. 286 operational TM-61 Matador missiles were test fired from Cape Canaveral, the first on 20 September 1951; the last on 1 June 1961.

- SM-62 Snark (1952–1959)

The SM-62 (Strategic Missile) program gave the U.S. Air Force valuable experience in developing long-range strategic nuclear missile systems. The SM-62 was a significant forerunner of cruise missiles developed many years later. The Wing received its first Snark training missile (e.g., an N-25 research vehicle) in late May 1952, and the 6556th Guided Missile Squadron activated a Snark cadre at AFMTC on 16 June. The squadron conducted 97 test launches at the Cape beginning on 29 August 1952 through 5 December 1960 from LC-1, LC-2 and LC-4 for the Snark Employment and Suitability Test (E and ST) program. There were several mishaps during the test program—though they were valuable learning experiences—caused some to label Florida’s coast as "Snark infested waters." On 27 June 1958, Strategic Air Command's (SAC) 556th Strategic Missile Squadron launched its first Snark (an N-69E) under the supervision of the 6555th GMS from LC-2. Under an informal agreement between Air Training Command and AFMTC, one officer and five airmen were sent to AFMTC in March 1959 and attached to the 6555th GMS to train officers and airmen for SAC's Snark unit at Presque Isle Air Force Base, Maine.

- IM-99 Bomarc (1952–1958)

The supersonic Bomarc missiles (IM-99A and IM-99B) were the world's first long-range anti-aircraft missiles, and the only surface-to-air missile (SAM) ever deployed by the United States Air Force. Unlike the Lark Missile program, the IM-99 Bomarc test program at the Cape was essentially a Boeing contractor-led operation. The 6555th's people were not responsible for any IM-99 Bomarc launches, but six airmen from the 6555th's 20-man IM-99 Bomarc Section were assigned to help Boeing with electronic equipment maintenance tasks in late March 1953, and nine other airmen assisted the University of Michigan with its IM-99 Bomarc activities at the Cape. The Air Force Missile Test Center provided range support and test facilities at the Cape, and AFMTC's safety agencies were responsible for ensuring that safety requirements for the 15,000-pound, 47-foot-long missile were "stringently enforced". Launch Pads 3 and LC-4 were used for IM-99 testing.

In relation to other aerodynamic missile programs at the Cape, the IM-99 Bomarc continued to move ahead slowly: the first Bomarc launch took place on 10 September 1952, however by the middle of 1956, only eight propulsion test vehicles, nine ramjet test vehicles and five guidance test vehicles had been launched. Two tactical prototype BOMARCs were launched against a QB-17 Flying Fortress target drone in October and November 1956, but the 6555th's people only played a supporting role in those tests and later contractor-led operations. Twenty-five Bomarc interceptor missiles were launched from the Cape before ARDC announced plans in September 1958 to transfer the Bomarc program from Cape Canaveral to the Air Proving Ground Center's Eglin AFB test site at Santa Rosa Island near Fort Walton Beach, Florida. The last Bomarc launch took place on 3 September 1958.

- TM-76 Mace (1956–1962)

A replacement for the TM-61A Matador, the Mace was a tactical surface-launched missile designed to destroy ground targets. Development of the Mace began in 1954, and the first test firing occurred in 1956. Testing was conducted from Hardsite Pads 21 and 22. The first version of the Mace, the "A", employed a terrain-matching radar guidance system known as ATRAN (Automatic Terrain Recognition And Navigation) which matched the return from a radar scanning antenna was matched with a series of onboard radar terrain "maps." The MACE B was an improved version of the MACE A, the B-61A Matador's immediate successor and used an inertial guidance system manufactured by the A.C. Spark Plug Company. The guidance system corrected the flight path if it deviated from the maps. The 6555th Guided Missile Squadron performed testing on the Mace beginning in 1956 with its first successful test firing. The division was phased out subsequently, and the Mace Weapons Branch (composed of five senior civil service engineers and 14 airmen) was established on 10 July 1961 to provide instrumentation support and engineering evaluation for 16 Mace Bs launched by Tactical Air Command's 4504th Missile Training Wing. The MACE Weapons Branch was dissolved at the conclusion of the MACE Category III Systems Operational Testing and Evaluation (SOTE) program in April 1962.

- X-10/XSM-64 Navaho (1955–1958)

The North American B-64 Navaho was designed as an interim strategic weapon to be used while the first-generation Intercontinental Ballistic Missiles were being perfected. The basic concept of the Navaho Program called for the weapon to be lofted to high altitude using a conventional strap-on rocket booster. Since the XB-64 (later redesignated XSM-64) was powered by ramjets, the engines were started after launch when sufficient speed required for ramjet operation was reached at approximately 50,000 feet.

The 6555th Guided Missile Squadron launched 15 Navahos during the test program between 1955 and 1958. Only two of three planned versions (e.g., the X-10 and the XSM-64) were ever launched at the Cape from LC-9 and LC-10. After six months of delays, the first X-10 flight took place 19 August 1955. On the XSM-64's first launch on 6 November 1956, the pitch gyro failed 10 seconds after lift-off, and the missile and its booster broke up and exploded 26 seconds into the flight. Three more XSM-64s were launched over the next seven months with depressing, if not equally dismal, results. The next missile fell back on the launch pad on 25 April after rising only four feet. The last of the three was launched on 26 June 1957. It performed well until the ramjets failed to operate after booster separation, and the missile impacted about 42 miles downrange. The only bright spots in the program seemed to be some static tests of the Navaho's booster rockets and North American's isolation of problem areas revealed in the first four XSM-64 flights. Unfortunately for North American, Navaho was already doomed. In a message dated 12 July 1957, Air Force Headquarters terminated the Navaho's development.

==== Ballistic missiles ====
The Air Force ballistic missile program had its origins in studies and projects initiated by the Army Air Corps immediately after World War II. Faced with growing evidence of the Soviet Union's development of thermonuclear weapons and ballistic missile technology in 1953, the Air Force established the Western Development Division (WDD) in Los Angeles to carry out that task.

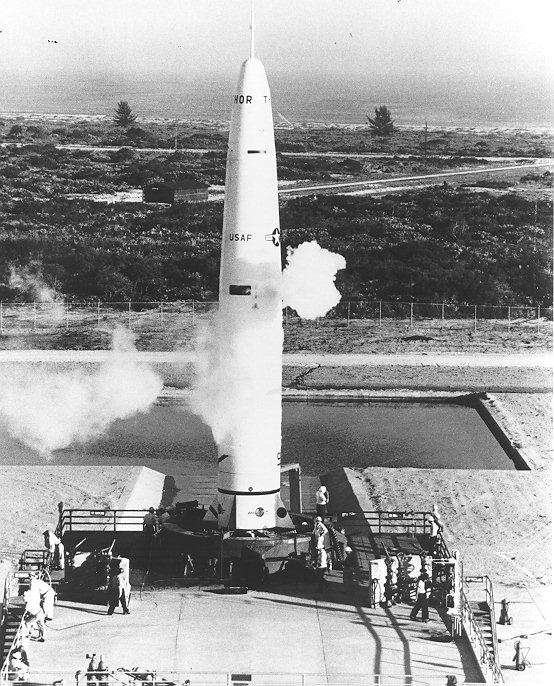
First launch of the PGM-17 Thor, 25 January 1957

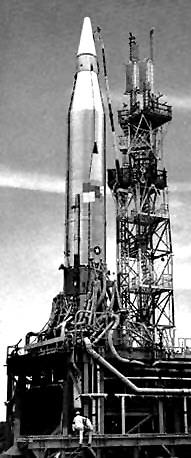
SM-65C Atlas on Pad 12

- PGM-17 Thor (1954–1959)

The Douglas SM-75/PGM-17A Thor was the first operational USAF ballistic missile. Thor was designed to be an interim nuclear deterrent while the U.S. Air Force developed long-range Intercontinental ballistic missiles (ICBMs) as a top national priority. The Air Force Missile Test Center became involved with the Thor (Weapon System 315A) program in the fall of 1954, after ARDC ordered development of that missile "as soon as possible." Following a series of meetings between AFMTC and Western Development Division officials in February and March 1955, support requirements were worked out for two launch pads, a blockhouse, a guidance site, one service stand, airborne guidance test equipment, housing and messing facilities.

The Air Force Ballistic Missile Division carried out the first test launch from Cape Canaveral Launch Complex 17B (LC-17B) on 25 January 1957. The first launch by a USAF SAC missile crew was made on 16 December 1958. Training turned over to Vandenberg AFB, 1959 for further testing and deployment to Great Britain and other locations in NATO. Still in use today, the Thor booster is used as the first stage of a space vehicle known as the Delta II used for Global Positioning Satellite (GPS) and commercial space launch operations.

- SM-65 Atlas (1957–1965)

The SM-65 Atlas missile was developed by General Dynamics (Convair Division) for the US Air Force. It was the first operational Intercontinental ballistic missile in America's nuclear arsenal and the beginning of the United States Space Program. The Atlas' development was a much larger enterprise than the Thor program, but its flight test program moved ahead quickly once the missile arrived at the Cape. The first XSM-16A Atlas prototype tested from Launch Pad 12 on 11 June 1957. Following completion of the XSM-16A flight test program in March, Convair proceeded with the SM-65A Atlas development program, which was scheduled to advance through four series of flight tests by the Air Force Ballistic Missile Division:

Series A – Airframe and propulsion tests, employing seven 181,000-pound test missiles between June and the end of December 1957. The first Series A (SM-65A) test missile was launched from Pad 14 on 11 June 1957, and was completed on 3 June 1958 from Pad 12.

Series B – Booster separation and propulsion tests, employing three 248,000-pound test missiles between January and the end of March 1958. The first Series B Atlas (SM-65B) was launched from a third site, Launch Pad 11, on 19 July 1958, the last on 2 April 1959 from Pad 11, although Pads 13 and 14 were also used in this testing phase.

Series C – Guidance and nose cone tests, employing eighteen 243,000-pound test missiles between April and the end of November 1958. The first Series C (SM-65C) missile was launched successfully from Pad 12 on 23 December 1958. The last Series C mission (launched from Pad 12 on 24 August 1959) ended on a high note when the missile's nose cone was recovered 5,000 miles downrange.

Series D – Operational tests of Atlas prototype (i.e., the complete missile), employing twenty-four 243,000-pound ATLAS prototypes. The first Series D (SM-65D) missile was launched from Pad 13 on 14 April 1959. The Air Force accepted the Atlas on 1 September 1959, and SAC Commander Thomas S. Power declared the missile "operational" about a week later.

The entire Atlas ICBM program was moved to Vandenberg AFB as Weapon System 107A-1 in 1959. Under continued pressure from an apparent "missile gap" between the U.S. and the Soviet Union, the U.S. Air Force moved quickly to activate the Atlas. Months before the "D" Series proved itself at the Cape, the first operational Atlas launch complex was completed at Vandenberg and ATLAS "D" missiles were put on alert at Vandenberg's Complex 576A shortly after SAC announced the missile as operational.

At the beginning of 1960, airmen assigned to the Atlas Operations Division were working for Convair on Atlas ground and flight tests as part of the 6555th's on-the-job training program. As this individual training continued, Convair launched 18 Atlas "D" and six SM-65 E Atlas test missiles from the Cape between 6 January 1960 and 25 March 1961. Following the 6555th's internal reorganization on 17 April 1961, the Atlas Project Division was divided into the Atlas Weapons Branch and the ATLAS Booster Branch. The Atlas Operations Division was integrated into the Atlas Weapons Division as one of three sections (e.g., systems, requirements, and operations). By 1 June, three Operations Section personnel were working at ARMA's guidance laboratory, and the rest of the Section's airmen had replaced contractor technicians at Complex 11 to turn that facility into military operation. Though that transformation was not completed in 1961, the Operations Section participated in five Atlas launches from Complex 11 in the last half of 1961, and airmen/technicians completed most of the checkout and launch items required on two of those flights. A total of 15 SM-65E and four SM-65F Atlas Series missiles were launched from complexes 11 and 13 during 1961.

The Atlas ICBM remained on alert over the next five years. All three Atlas series were phased out between May 1964 and March 1965 as part of a general retirement of the nation's first-generation Atlas and Titan I ICBMs. Like the Thor, the Atlas booster was mated to a variety of high energy upper stages over the next quarter century, and remains an important part of the U.S. space program.

- HGM-25A Titan I (1957–1962)

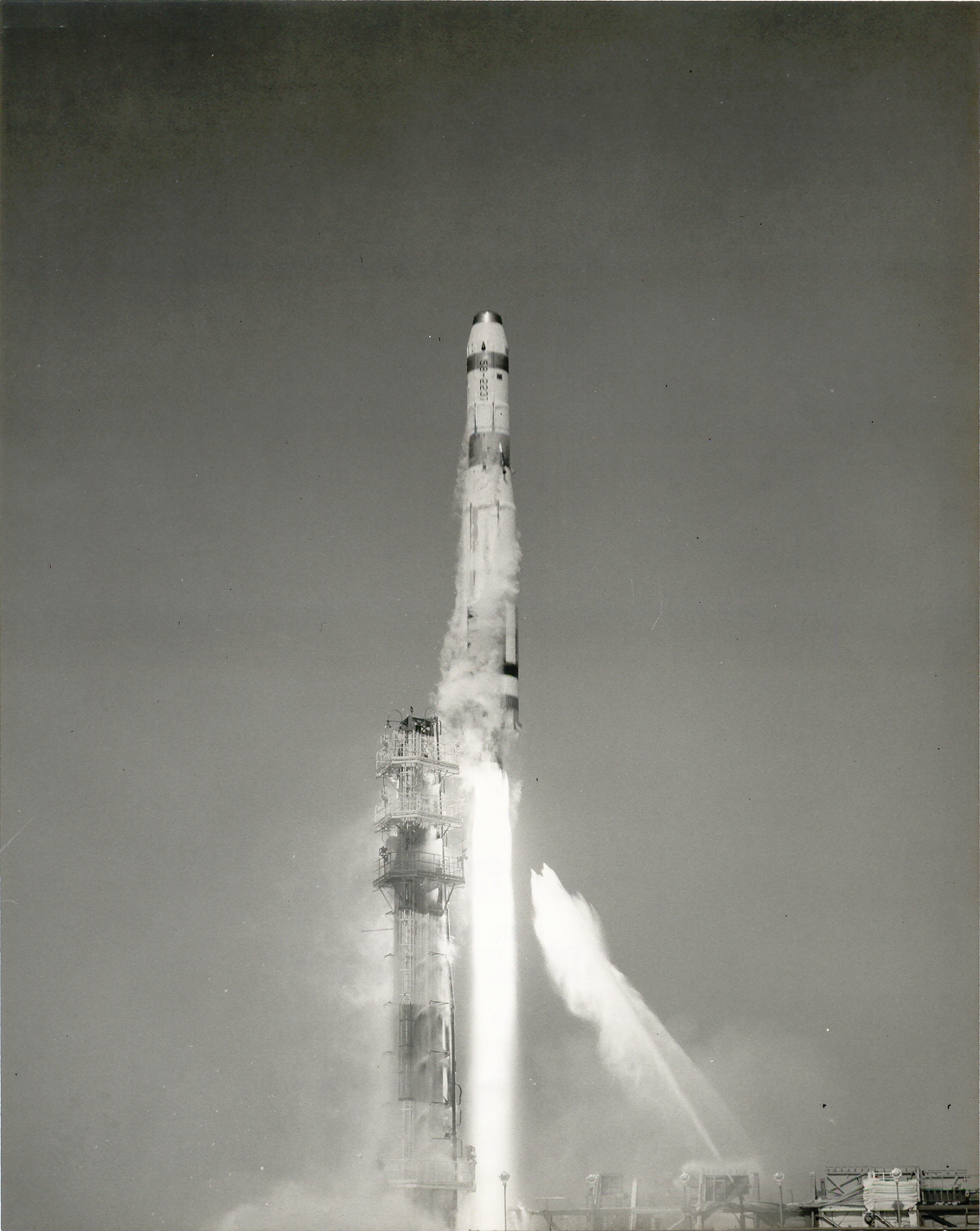
Titan I test missile launch from Cape Canaveral

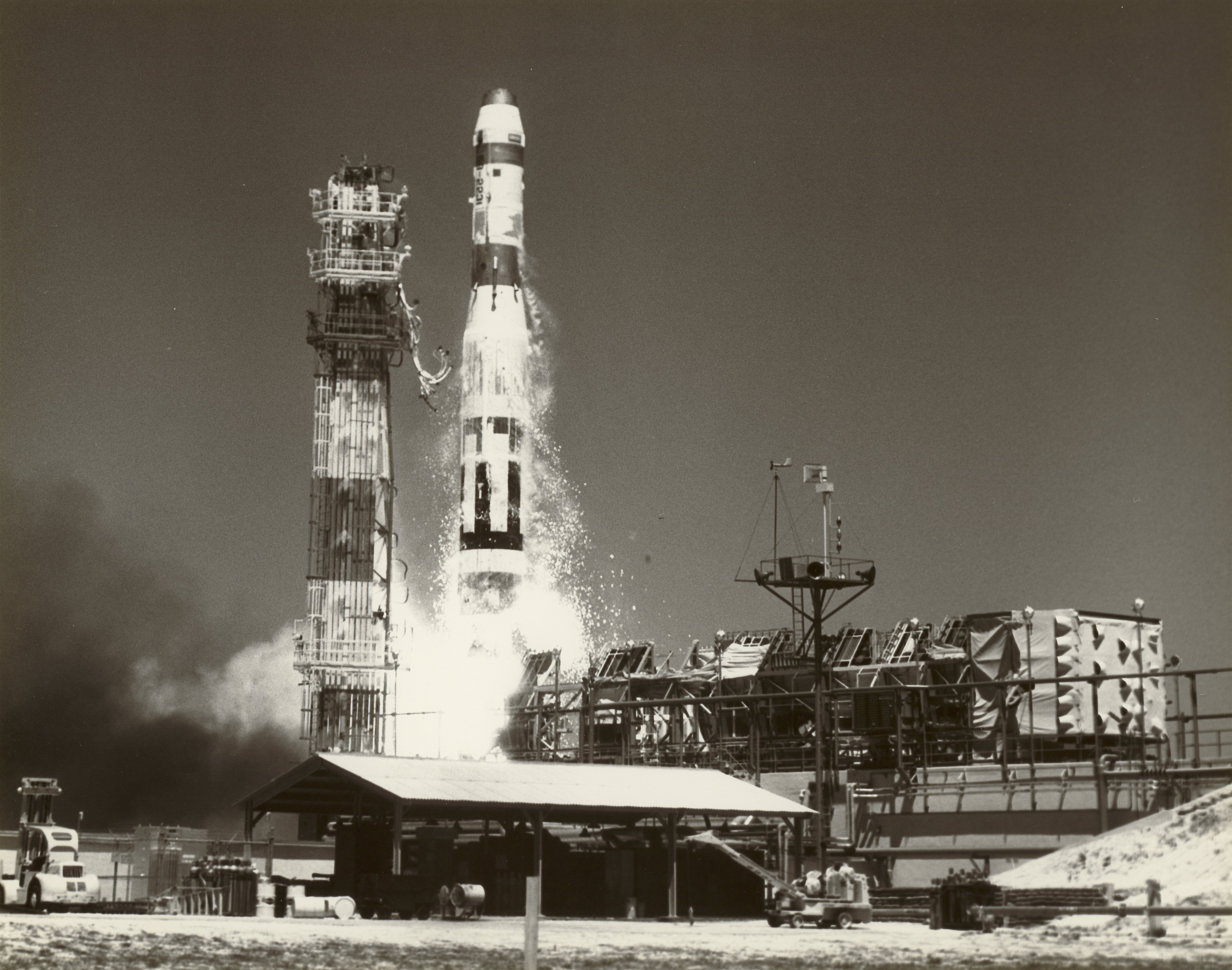
Launch from LC 16, 4 April 1960

The Titan I Weapon System 107A-2 program was pursued initially as insurance against the SM-65 Atlas possible failure, but it enjoyed many technological refinements that had been deliberately left out of the Atlas to avoid delays in the Atlas deployment – The Titan I was also known as the XSM-68 (Xperimental Strategic Missile 68) while it was under development.

The Titan I flight test program was divided into Series I, II and III. Twelve flights were programmed for each of the first two series, and 45 Series III flights were anticipated to complete the program. To save time, Series I and II tests would be run concurrently with considerable overlap in the flights. The Titan I assembly buildings were ready for functional tests by the summer of 1958, and the contractor shifted to around-the-clock operations in September to get the first Titan I Complex (LC 15) ready for use by the end of November 1958. Launch Complex 16 was almost finished by the end of the year, and Launch Complexes 19 and 20 were finished in 1959. The first Titan I arrived at Cape Canaveral on 19 November 1958.

The 6555th Test Wing (Development) had separate project test divisions and operations divisions for the Titan I project. The project divisions were grouped under the Director of Tests, who exercised on-the-spot technical supervision of contractor-conducted missile tests. The operations divisions were organized under the Director of Operations, who was charged with providing a USAF-capable launch capability for missile and space programs. Under the 6555th's Director of Support, there were other divisions for engineering, instrumentation, plans and requirements, facilities, materiel and inspection. Those divisions provided an Air Force test and evaluation capability for missiles and space vehicles. The Titan Project Division had jurisdiction over four Titan Launch Complexes (15, 16, 19 and 20), a radio-guidance site and laboratory, an all-inertial guidance lab, hangars T and U, and a reentry vehicle hangar

Series I flights were designed to test the Titan's first stage and explore the problem of starting the second stage's rocket engine at altitude. The first four Titan I test missiles were launched from Complex 15 on 6 February 25 February 3 April and 4 May 1959.

On Series II flights, the second stage's guidance system was operated in conjunction with the Titan's control system, and those flights served the additional purpose of testing the Titan's nose cone separation mechanism. Series II was begun with a launch 14 August 1959 from LC 19. It was completed with a test launch from LC 16 on 27 May 1960

Series III flights validated the performance of the Titan I production prototype. Series III test launches began on 24 June 1960 from LC 15.

The 6555th also began developing a military launch capability for the Titan I ballistic missile program at the Cape in 1959. By the spring of 1960, the Titan Operations Division had completed about 50 percent of the training needed to form an all-military Titan launch crew, and many of its airmen were working with the Martin Company as members of the contractor's Titanfiring teams.

The last Titan I test launch was performed from LC 20 on 20 December 1960, and the project was turned over to Vandenberg AFB for operational deployment. The Titan I was first American ICBM based in underground silos, being deployed and made operational in April 1961. Though the Titan I was operational for only three years, it was an important step in building the Air Force's strategic nuclear forces.

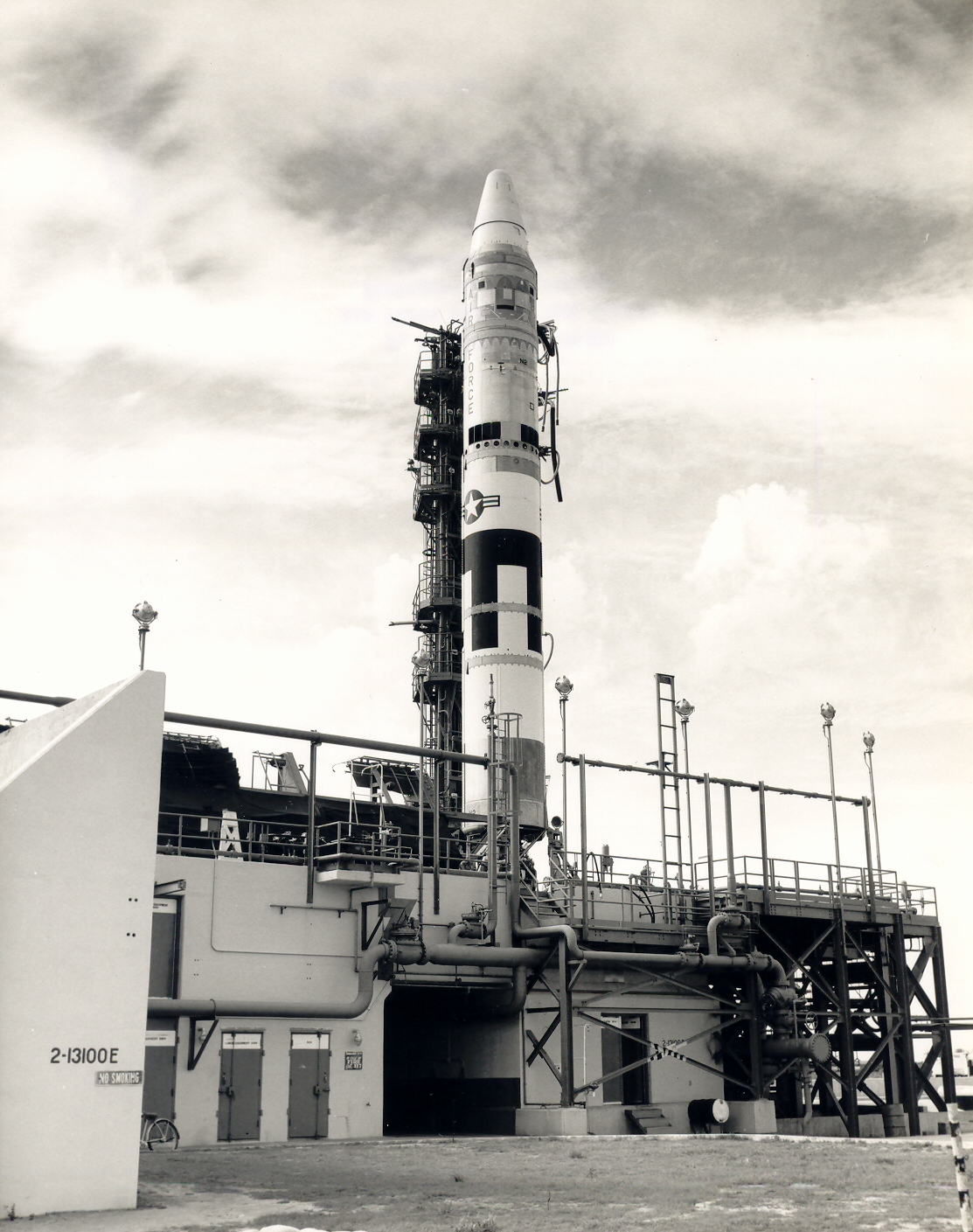
Titan II at LC 16 ready for a test launch

- LGM-25C Titan II (1962–1964)

While the SM-68A Titan I system was becoming operational, the USAF recognized that it could be simplified and improved. Using the same manufacturing and test facilities, the SM-68B took shape as a major step forward in ICBM technology. Perhaps Titan II's most important feature was its quick-launch capability. It could be launched in about 60 seconds from inside its underground silo (Titan I took 15 minutes and had to be elevated above ground first). This speed was crucial in responding to a preemptive nuclear attack before incoming missiles arrived.

Almost immediately after the release of the Titan I from the R&D testing program, the Titan Division began R&D testing on the follow-on LGM-25C Titan II. The Section's people received two months of formal training at Martin's Titan plant in Denver during the first half of 1962, and they continued their on-the-job training at Cape Canaveral. Launch complexes 15 and 16 were modified to launch the new missile, and the first test flight of the Titan II was made on 16 March 1962 from LC-15. Two more successful test flights were made from complexes 15 and 16 on 6 July and 7 November.

The Operations Branch's participation in Titan II launches remained somewhat limited during this period, but its involvement increased significantly during three test flights on 12 September 26 October and 19 December 1962. Finally, on 6 February 1963, the Titan Weapons Division recorded its first USAF crew launch of the Titan II. The Operations Branch's second shift launch crew completed their Titan II training on 21 August 1963 with a highly successful test flight from Complex 15.

Four more Titan II test flights were launched from Complex 15 in 1964 before the missile's R&D program was concluded at Cape Canaveral. Two of the flights, which were launched on 15 January and 26 February 1964, met some of their test objectives. The other two test flights, on 23 March and 9 April 1964, met all of their objectives. Upon completion of testing on 30 June 1964, the Titan Weapons Division was discontinued and its personnel were reassigned to other divisions.

- LGM-30 Minuteman (1959–1970)

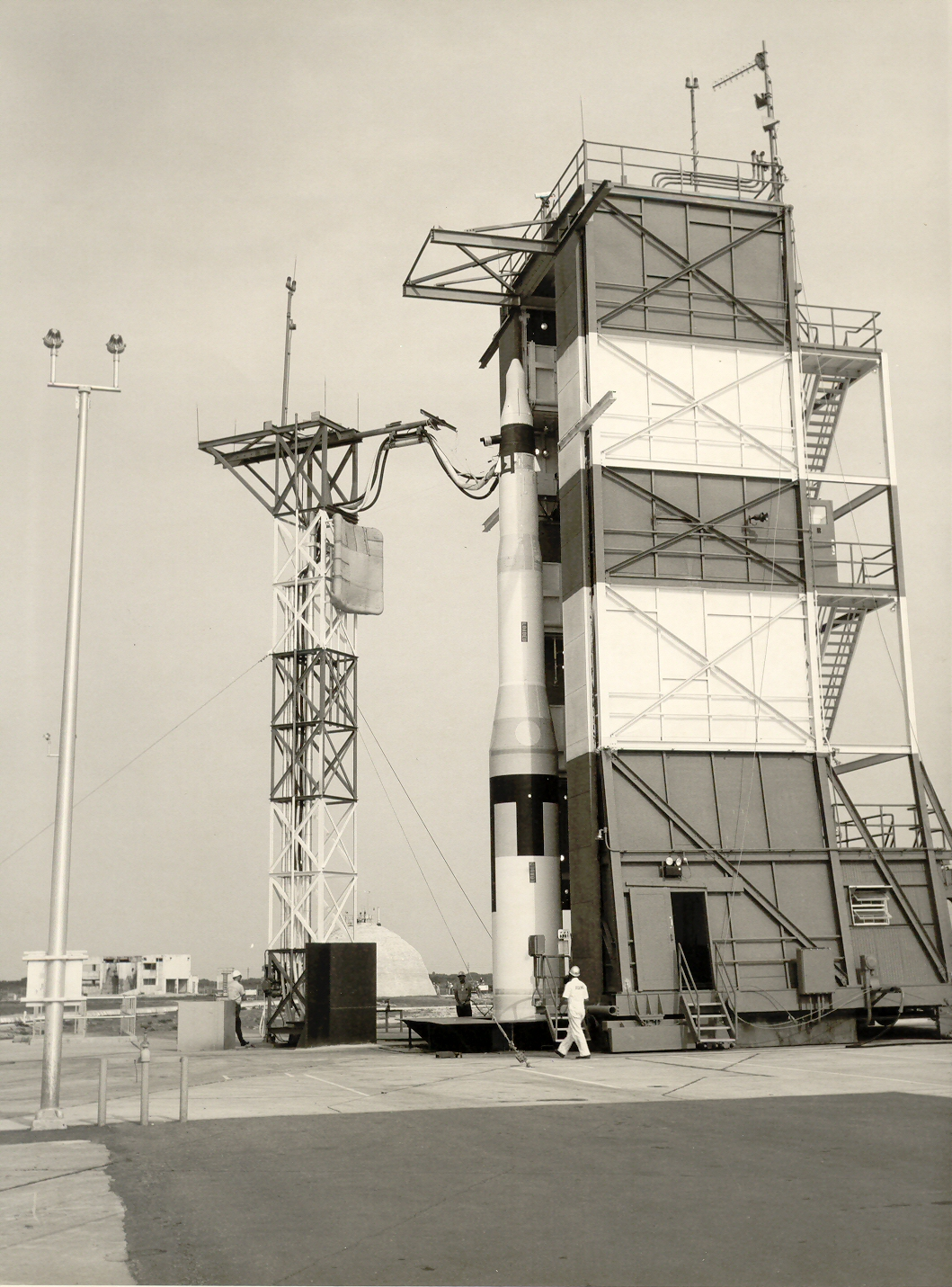
LGM-30A Minuteman IA on Launch Pad 31

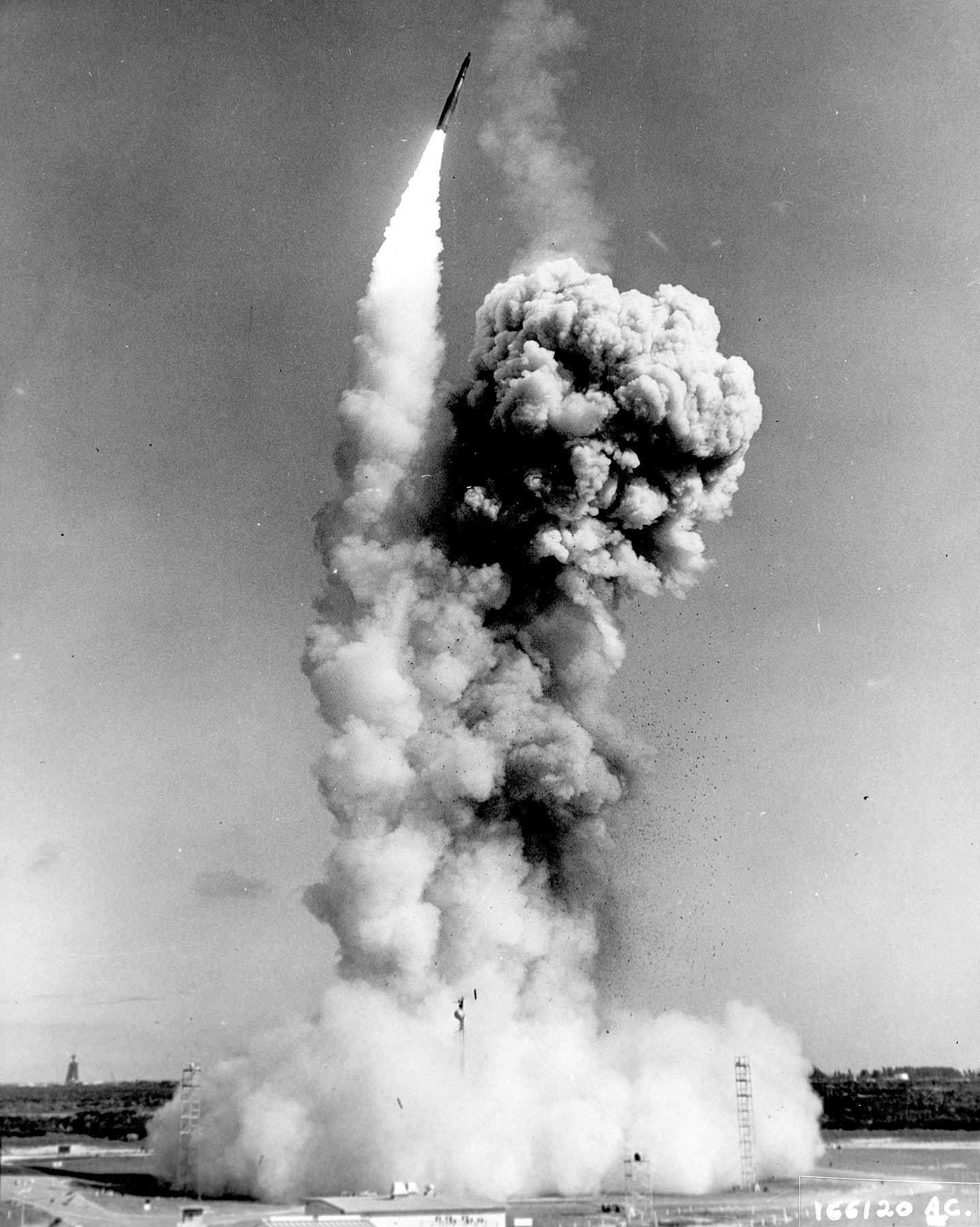
Minuteman I Launch from Pad 32B, 17 November 1961

Boeing LGM-30A Minuteman IA

Boeing LGM-30A Minuteman IA missiles were the first generation of a revolutionary new family of ICBMs. They used solid rather than liquid fuel, and so could be launched in less than a minute – hence the "Minuteman" name, referring to colonial American farmers who could be ready to defend their homes at a moment's notice. In contrast to Minuteman, older missiles like Atlas and Titan I took up to half an hour to fuel and launch. They were also complex and costly, requiring close monitoring and constant maintenance, and their propellants could be dangerous. Moreover, they tended to be vulnerable to attack.

Minuteman missile testing was the last intercontinental ballistic missile effort at Cape Canaveral. The 6555th Test Wing Minuteman activities began on 21 December 1959 with the Minuteman Project Division. An inert LGM-30A Minuteman I missile was processed along with 90 percent of its support equipment in the spring of 1960. Another inert missile (equipped with electrical components to test the facilities' electronic compatibility) was assembled and tested at the Cape in October and November 1960. Last-minute construction, equipment installation and launch pad preparations also required an around-the-clock effort from Boeing toward the end of 1960 to get the facility ready for the first Minuteman I launch from Launch Pad 31 on 1 February 1961. The flight was highly successful, and it set a record for being the first launch operation in which all stages of a multi-staged missile were tested on the very first test flight of an R&D program. First USAF crew flight occurred on 27 June 1963.

Successes alternated with failures when the second and fourth Minuteman I missiles were destroyed during their flights from Pad 31 and Silo 32 on 19 May and 30 August 1961, but two other Minuteman flights were launched from Silo 32 and Silo 31 before the end of 1961, and they met most of their test objectives. Apart from one flight failure in April 1962, Boeing had a string of five successful flights from Silo 31 between 5 January and 9 March 1962, and the Cape recorded four more successful test flights from Silo 32 in May and June 1962. (The latter included the first all-military launch of a Minuteman I missile on 29 June.) After a bad start, test results in the last half of 1962 were also somewhat mixed: two Minuteman I test missiles destroyed themselves during test flights in July and August 1962, and another Minuteman I had to be destroyed by the Range Safety Officer approximately eight seconds after launch on 17 October. Five successful test flights were recorded in September, November and December 1962, and the year's operations were capped by a partially successful flight from Silo 32 on 20 December.

While Minuteman I launches continued at Cape Canaveral, other aspects of the Minuteman program advanced elsewhere in the United States. On 28 September 1962, for example, a Minuteman I missile was launched from Vandenberg Air Force Base for the first time in that base's history. The first Minuteman I (model "A") flight of 10 missiles was placed on alert at Malmstrom Air Force Base, Montana on 27 October 1962, and the first full squadron of 50 Minuteman I missiles was on alert at Malmstrom by the spring of 1963. By July 1964, 600 Minuteman I missiles were dispersed in hardened underground launch facilities at 12 operational missile squadrons in the western United States

LGM-30B Minuteman IB

Technological improvements in the Minuteman had already out-distanced its deployment by that time, and the Secretary of Defense approved a program in November 1963 to gradually replace the entire Minuteman I "A" and "B" force with more powerful Minuteman II missiles. The first LGM-30B Minuteman IB missiles went on alert at Ellsworth Air Force Base, South Dakota in July 1963, and Ellsworth's 66th Strategic Missile Squadron was declared operational less than three months later.

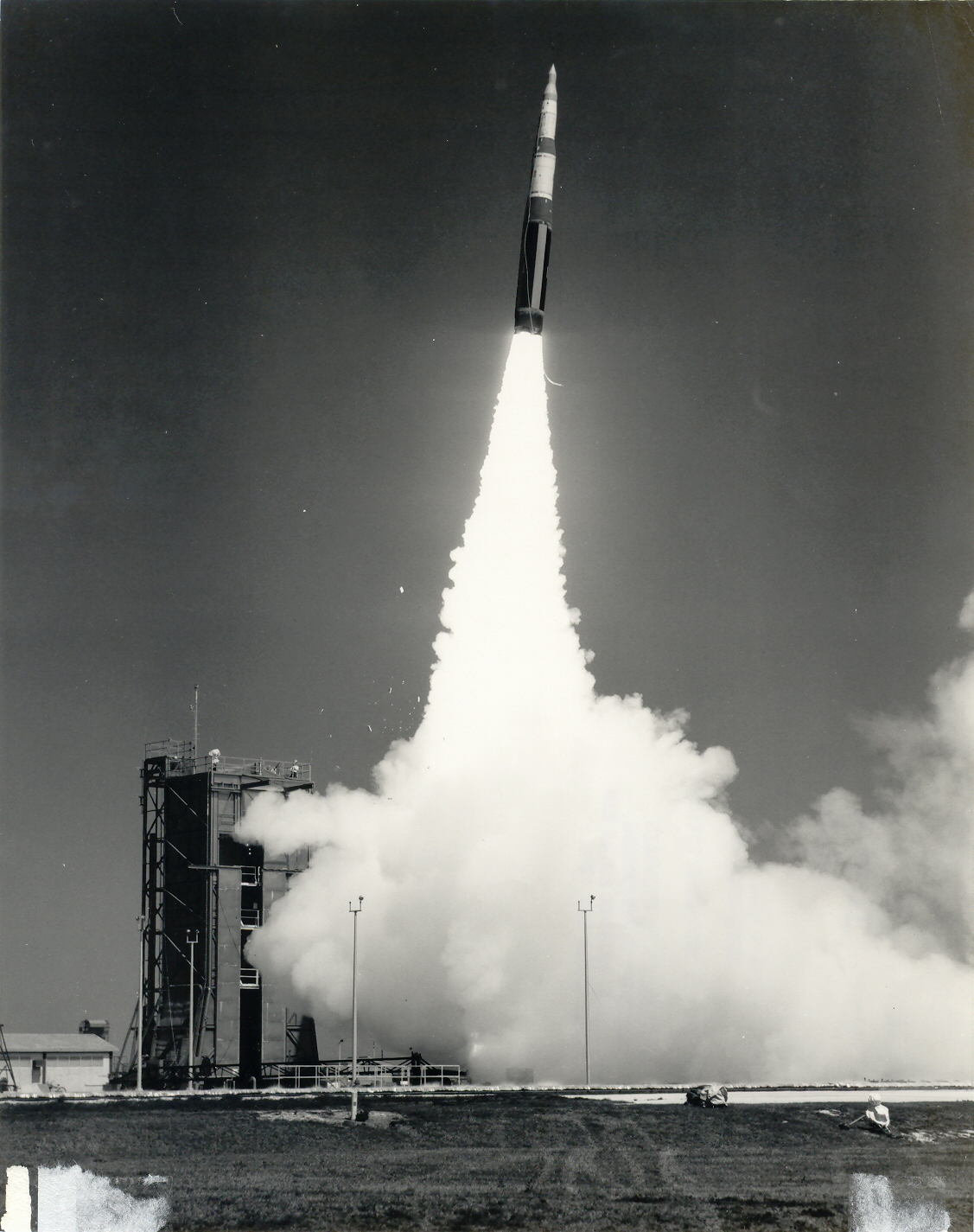
Minuteman II missile launch from LC-32, Pad B, 25 May 1965

LGM-30F Minuteman II

On 2 October 1963, shortly after the first model "A" and "B" Minuteman I squadrons achieved operational status, Headquarters USAF issued Annex A to Specific Operational Requirement 171 which established a requirement for the Minuteman II ICBM (Model "F"). A more advanced missile than either model of the Minuteman I, the "F" model incorporated a new, larger second-stage, improved guidance system, a greater range and payload capacity, and an increased capability to survive the effects of nuclear blast.

Facilities were reconfigured for the Minuteman II program during the last half of 1964, and the Operations Branch launched the first Minuteman II test missile from Silo 32 on 24 September. Three additional highly successful Minuteman II flights were launched from Cape Canaveral before the end of 1964, and they were followed by a string of seven near-perfect test flights from silos 31 and 32 in 1965. The Operations Branch launched four Minuteman II test missiles in 1966, and it launched four more in 1967. The final Minuteman II was launched from the Cape on 6 February 1968.

LGM-30G Minuteman III

Operations Branch successfully launched the first Minuteman III test missile from Silo 32 on 16 August 1968. That flight was followed by nine other test flights from Silo 32 and Silo 31 between 24 October 1968 and 13 March 1970 Though four of those later Minuteman III flights failed to meet their test objectives, the Operations Branch wrapped up the Minuteman III R&D flight test program with three highly successful flights from Silo 32 between 3 April and 28 May 1970. Though three more Minuteman III missiles were launched from Silo 32 on 16 September 2 and 14 December 1970, they were launched by Boeing for the Special Test Missile (STM) project – a post-R&D effort to evaluate the Minuteman III's performance and accuracy. Following the final Minuteman III launch on 14 December, the Minuteman Test Division continued to reduce its numbers, and only a handful of personnel were retained to complete the disposition of Minuteman equipment after the division was deactivated on 31 December 1970. The remaining personnel were reassigned to other duties, and the last of the Minuteman contractors departed in 1971.

The 6555th's role in ballistic missile development ended with the Minuteman III flight test program in 1970, but Minuteman and Titan missile tests continued under SAC and the 6595th Aerospace Test Wing at Vandenberg Air Force Base.

=== Space launch operations ===
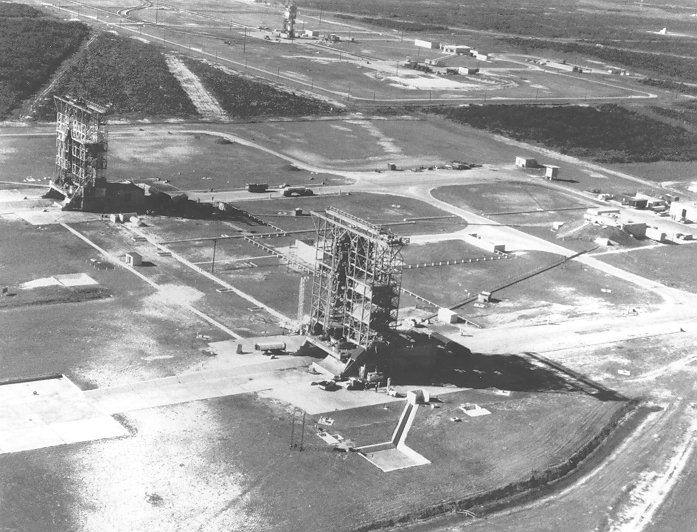
Cape Canaveral Launch Complex 17 showing Pads 17A and 17B – 1961

The Air Force's interest in artificial satellites—and hence, space operations—was sparked by discussions with the Navy shortly after the end of World War II. At Major General Curtis E. LeMay's request, the Douglas Aircraft Company's RAND group provided The Pentagon with a 321-page study in May 1946 on the feasibility of satellites for military reconnaissance, weather surveillance, communications and missile navigation.

The Soviets' successful launch of Sputnik I on 4 October 1957 came as a shock to the American public, but the military implications of that capability came into even sharper focus as much heavier payloads were orbited from the Soviet Union in the months and years that followed. Galvanized into action by the Soviet Union's achievements, the U.S. Department of Defense set high priorities on the development of military satellite systems. It also created the Advanced Research Projects Agency (ARPA) on 7 February 1958 to supervise all U.S. military space efforts. The Air Force drew up a crewed military space system development plan in April 1958, and it also volunteered to carry out the U.S. man-in-space mission. Though much of the plan was incorporated in later crewed space efforts (e.g., Project Mercury, Project Gemini and Project Apollo), President Dwight Eisenhower rejected the Air Force's offer to lead the effort. Instead, he called on Congress to establish a civilian space agency, and the National Aeronautics and Space Act was passed by Congress in July 1958.

Since the Air Research and Development Command was destined to serve the Air Force and two non-Air Force clients in space (i.e., ARPA and NASA), effective coordination among the agencies was crucial to the early success of the space mission. Before the 6555th absorbed the Air Force Ballistic Missile Division's resources at the Cape in December 1959, most of the Air Force's participation in the Cape's space launch operations was managed by the WS-315A (THOR) Project Division under the Air Force Ballistic Missile Division's Assistant Commander for Missile Tests. The WS-315A Project Division was redesignated the Space Project Division on 16 November 1959, and it became the Space Projects Division under the 6555th Test Wing on 15 February 1960.

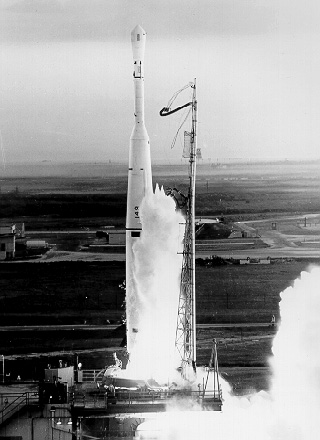
The TIROS 1 satellite launched from LC-17A by Thor 148 / Able 2 on 1 April 1960

Following the establishment of Air Force Systems Command, the 6555th's Test Directorate and Operations Directorate were transformed into the Space Programs Office and the Ballistic Missiles Office on 17 April 1961. Under that reorganization, the old Atlas Project Office's resources were divided roughly in half to create an Atlas Booster Branch and an Atlas Weapons Branch. The Atlas Booster Branch was placed under the Space Programs Office. The old Atlas Operations Division became the new Atlas Weapons Branch's Operations Section, and the new Atlas Weapons Branch was placed under the Ballistic Missiles Office. The Space Projects Division became the Space Projects Branch under the Space Programs Office on 17 April, and its Thor Booster Branch (created on 17 March 1961) was removed and set up as a separate branch under the Space Programs Office.

==== Thor-Able (1958–1961) ====
The division had jurisdiction over Complex 17 and three missile assembly buildings (e.g. hangars M, L and AA). It supported a total of 10 Air Force-sponsored Thor-Able, Thor-Able I and Thor-Able II space launches from Pad 17A before the end of 1959. The division also supported NASA's Pioneer 1 and Pioneer 2 missions, which were launched by Douglas from Pad 17A on 11 October and 8 November 1958, and NASA's Explorer 6 mission, which was launched by Douglas from Pad 17A on 7 August 1959. Under the 6555th Test Wing (Development), the Space Projects Division managed five Thor-Able-Star missions for the Army, the Navy and ARPA in 1960. It also monitored Douglas' preparation and launch of two Thor-Able boosters for NASA's Pioneer 5 deep space mission to Venus in March 1960 and its TIROS-1 weather satellite mission in April 1960.

==== Atlas (Atlas-Agena, Atlas-Centaur, Atlas-Project Mercury) (1959–1965) ====
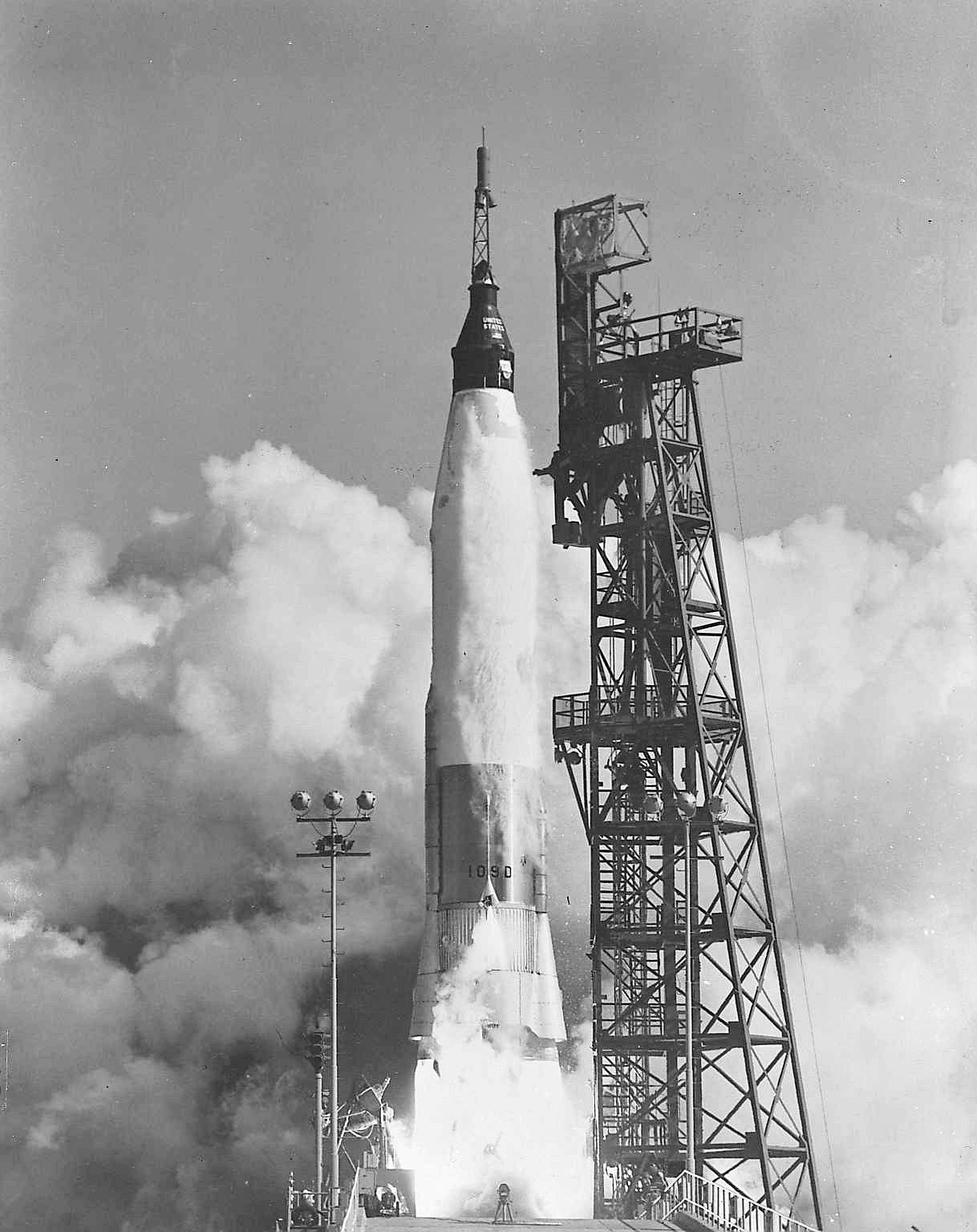
Launch of Mercury-Atlas 6, 20 February 1962

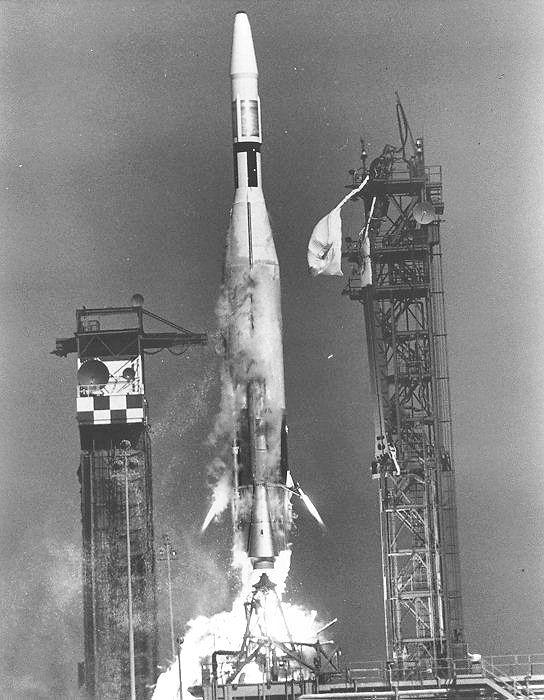
Atlas-Agena launch of Ranger IV Moon Probe 23 April 1962

1961 proved to be a very busy year for the 6555th and its space launch contractors. Following its first two uncrewed Project Mercury capsule launches for NASA in September 1959 (Big Joe 1) and July 1960 (Mercury-Atlas 1), Convair launched Atlas-D boosters on three successful (and one unsuccessful) Project Mercury flights from Complex 14 in 1961 (Mercury-Atlas 2, Mercury-Atlas 3, Mercury-Atlas 4). The Douglas Aircraft Company launched three Transit navigation satellite missions from Pad 17B for the U.S. Navy, and it provided booster support for two Project Explorer missions and one TIROS mission (TIROS-3) that were launched from Pad 17A in 1961. Aeroneutronic and the Blue Scout Branch's Operations Section launched a total of six space vehicles from pads 18A and 18B in 1961. NASA Associate Administrator Robert C. Seamans, Jr. signed a joint NASA/ARDC agreement on 30 January 1961 concerning the Air Force's participation in the RM-81 Agena B Launch Vehicle Program, and the 6555th's participation in the Centaur program was settled with NASA under a joint memorandum of agreement in April 1961.

The Air Force Ballistic Missile Division procured the ATLAS boosters required by the program, and it provided operational, administrative and technical support for those launch vehicles. NASA's Jet Propulsion Laboratory and the Goddard Space Flight Center provided the spacecraft. The Launch Operations Directorate's Test Support Office acted as NASA's formal point of contact for all agencies involved in the Agena B program on the Eastern Test Range, but the 6555th was responsible for supervising the Air Force contractors who provided the boosters for the Agena B. While many tests were observed jointly by NASA and Air Force representatives, NASA was responsible for the spacecraft, Lockheed was responsible for the Agena B, Convair was responsible for the Atlas-D booster, and the 6555th was responsible for the readiness of the entire launch vehicle. Ultimately, NASA's Operations and Test Director had overall responsibility for the countdown, but he received direct inputs from the 6555th's Test Controller concerning the vehicle's status on launch day.

The 6555th was also allowed to assign Air Force supervisors to Convair's processing teams while they were working on Atlas-D boosters for the Atlas-Centaur R&D test flights. In instances where NASA's Launch Operations Directorate wanted procedures added to Convair's Atlas-D checklists, the 6555th integrated those items. NASA also agreed to coordinate Centaur test documentation with the 6555th. To avoid duplication of effort, NASA and the Air Force agreed to share "a large number of facilities" (e.g., Complex 36 and hangars H, J and K) for the Centaur, Agena-B and Project Mercury efforts. Since NASA planned to use the Centaur's facilities first, the Air Force secured a promise from NASA to coordinate its Centaur facility and equipment modifications with the 6555th before the changes were made. The 6555th agreed to make an officer available as a consultant to NASA's Launch Director during Atlas-Centaur launch operations.

In 1962, Air Force contractors and the Atlas Space Branch supported three Ranger program and two Mariner program missions from Complex 12, and they supported the first three crewed orbital Mercury-Atlas missions, which were launched from Complex 14. All those NASA missions were launched by contractors, but the Air Force implemented plans in the last half of 1962 to establish an Atlas-Agena B USAF launch capability. The division's Project Mercury support mission ended following the last Mercury flight in May 1963 (Mercury-Atlas 9), but the unit still supported DOD operations on Complex 13. It picked up Atlas-Agena B Target Vehicle operations for Project Gemini shortly thereafter.

==== Titan II (Thor-Titan, Titan-Project Gemini)(1961–1966) ====
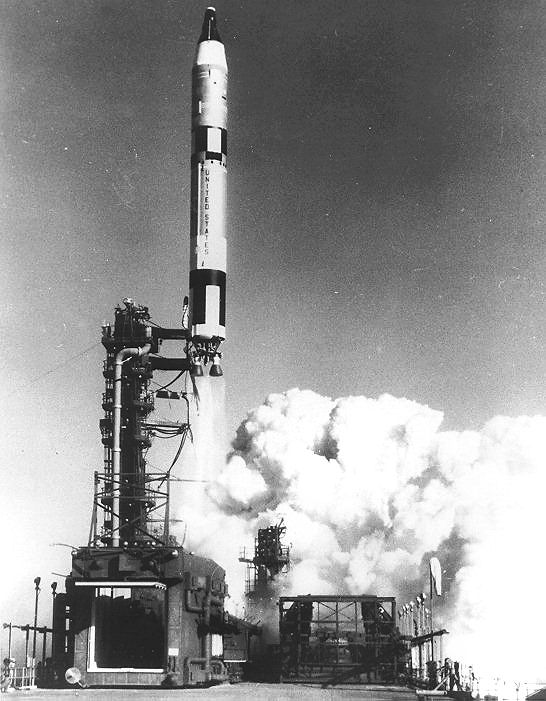
Launch of Gemini II, 19 January 1965

Thor-Titan Branch formed in 1961 by re-designation of Thor Booster Branch. On 10 September 1962, the Wing established the SLV-V Division to handle the Titan III program separately, and it transferred Titan III personnel from the Thor/Titan Branch to the new division before renaming it the SLV-V/X-20 Division on 1 October 1962. The Thor/Titan Branch became the SLV II/IV Division on 1 October 1962, but it was split up to form two new divisions—the SLV II Division (for Thor) and the Project Gemini Launch Vehicle Division for Titan II) – on 20 May 1963.

Though Complex 17 supported seven other NASA missions in 1964 and 1965, the two-part ASSET (Aerothermodynamic/Elastic Structural Systems Environmental Tests) program quickly became the SLV-II Division's principal interest after the first Project ASSET launch on 18 September 1963. Under one part of the ASSET flight test program at the Cape, the second, third, and sixth hypervelocity vehicles were launched from Pad 17B on 24 March 1964, 22 July 1964 and 23 February 1965. Those flights were designed to gather data on the ability of materials and structures to handle the pressures and temperatures of atmospheric reentry. Though the flight on 24 March failed to meet its test objectives due to a malfunction in the Thor rocket's upper stage, the other two flights were successful, and the vehicle launched on 22 July was recovered. Under the other part of the ASSET flight testing, two nonrecoverable delta wing glide vehicles were launched from Pad 17B on 27 October and 8 December 1964. Both missions were designed to obtain data on "panel flutter" under high heating conditions and information of the vehicles' "unsteady aerodynamics" over a broad range of hypersonic speeds. Both flights were successful, and the final ASSET flight on 23 February 1965 completed the ASSET program.

The Air Force had no further use for Thor rocket facilities at Cape Canaveral after the ASSET program was completed, so the Space Systems Division directed the 6555th to turn over its SLV-II facilities to NASA for the civilian agency's Thor-Delta (DM-19) program. In accordance with Air Force Eastern Test Range procedures, the 6555th returned the facilities to the Range in April 1965, and the Air Force Eastern Test Range transferred them to NASA's Kennedy Space Center in May 1965.

The 6555th's Titan-Gemini Division lasted considerably longer than its SLV-II Division. The division exercised technical test control over the Titan II GLV launch vehicle, but the Martin Company launched the booster. Martin launched the first uncrewed Gemini-Titan GLV mission from Complex 19 on 8 April 1964, and the flight succeeded in placing an uncrewed 7,000-pound Gemini 1 capsule into low earth orbit on that date. The first crewed Gemini mission (Gemini 3) was launched from Complex 19 on 23 March 1965, and it met all of its test objectives. (Astronauts Virgil I. Grissom and John W. Young were recovered with their capsule in the primary recovery area after three orbits on March 23d.) Nine more pairs of astronauts were boosted into orbit aboard Gemini-Titan GLV launch vehicles in 1965 and 1966, and seven Atlas-Agena target vehicles were launched from Complex 14 in support of six Project Gemini missions. Following the last highly successful Gemini-Titan GLV flight in November 1966, the Gemini Launch Vehicle Division completed its mission and began transferring personnel to other Air Force bases or to other agencies under the 6555th Aerospace Test Wing. As overall manager for Project Gemini, NASA was understandably proud of its role in the highly successful effort, but the Air Force and its contractors planned, built and launched all the Titan II GLV space boosters associated with Project Gemini.

==== Titan IIIA/C (1961–1982) ====
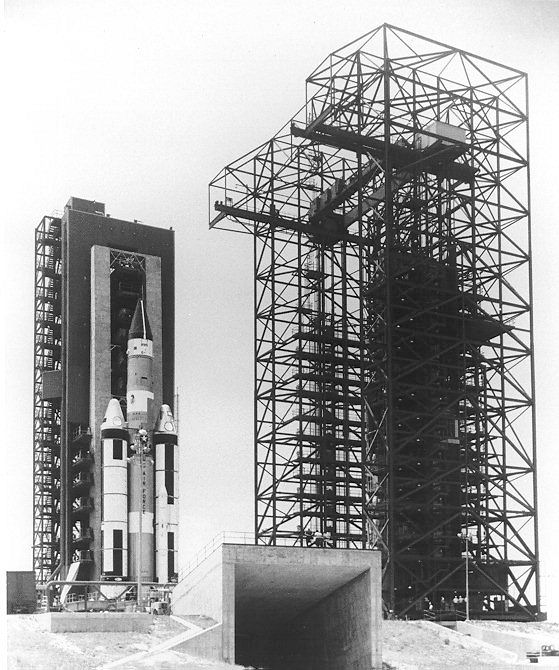
Titan IIIC and Gantry on Launch Pad 40 – 23 May 1965

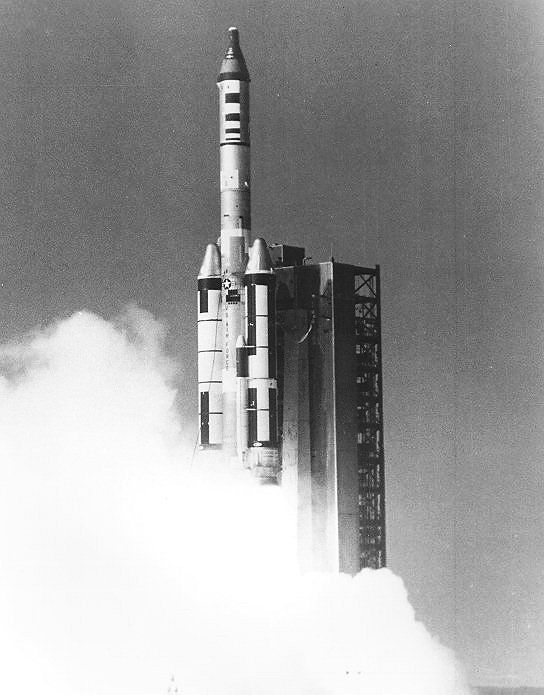
Titan IIIC and Gemini 2/MOL Test Launch – 3 November 1966

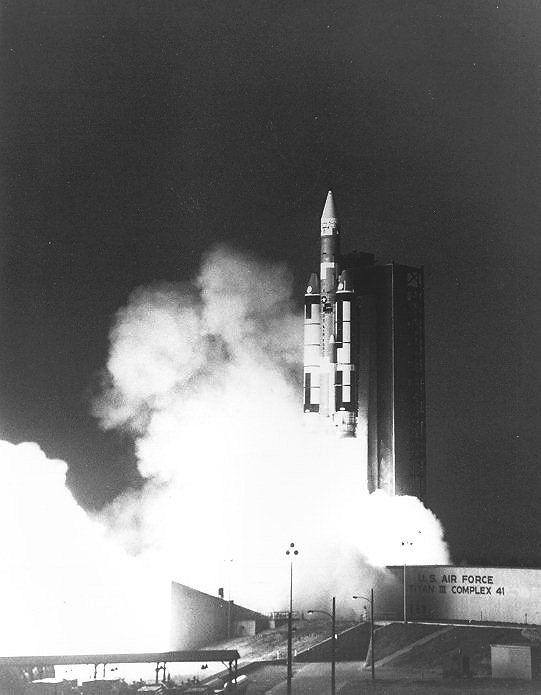
Titan IIIC IDCSP Satellite launch from Pad 41

NASA's plans for the Saturn heavy-lift rocket program were already underway in 1961, and the agency saw no need for a military heavyweight space booster for low earth orbit, geosynchronous orbit or deep space missions. Consequently, NASA resisted the Air Force's first attempts to secure funding for the Titan III initiative, and the Air Force had to work long and hard to prepare its case for the Titan III.

It was decided that the Titan III would be developed exclusively for Department of Defense heavy-lift orbital missions after 1965. Following that concession, initial funding for the Titan III contractual effort was granted on 11 December 1961, and Space Systems Division's new 624A Systems Program Office began managing the Titan III program four days later. Initially the Titan III was planned for use in the X-20 Dyna Soar crewed space glider which could be boosted into orbit, maneuvered, and piloted back to Earth. Plans for the program called for two uncrewed and eight crewed Titan IIIC space flights with crewed glider landings at Edwards Air Force Base. At Secretary McNamara's request, it was stopped by President Lyndon B. Johnson in December 1963 before any space flights were flown.

Though Titan III Complex 41 extended across the Cape Canaveral boundary into NASA's territory on Merritt Island, all property within Complex 41's security fence and along the access road to the site was considered part of the Air Force's Titan III program. Put simply, NASA had jurisdiction over the Merritt Island Launch Area, the Saturn rocket program and Saturn rocket facilities on Merritt Island and Cape Canaveral. The Air Force had jurisdiction over Cape Canaveral, the Titan III program and all Titan III facilities, including Complex 41. Though the Air Force Eastern Test Range and its contractors continued to provide range support for all of NASA's launch vehicle programs on Merritt Island and Cape Canaveral, the Saturn rocket and Titan III rocket programs were pursued as distinctly separate NASA and Air Force launch efforts.

Martin launched the first Titan IIIA from Complex 20 on 1 September 1964, and three more TITAN IIIA flights were completed before the first TITAN IIIC was launched from Complex 40 on a successful mission on 18 June 1965. Following the fourth and final TITAN IIIA launch on 6 May 1965, Complex 20 was deactivated and returned to the Air Force Eastern Test Range in September 1965. Complex 41 was turned over to the Titan III Division's Operations Branch for beneficial occupancy on 18 June 1965, and the facility was accepted by the Air Force in December 1965. The first Titan IIIC lifted off Pad 41 on 21 December. The flight met most of its test objectives, including the successful release of the LES-3 and LES-4 communications satellites and the OSCAR IV amateur radio satellite. Two more Titan IIIC missions were launched from Complex 41 on 16 June and 26 August 1966. The first of those flights included the successful release of seven Initial Defense Communications Satellite Program (IDCSP) satellites and one gravity gradient satellite, but the second flight ended after the Titan IIIC's payload fairing broke up approximately 79 seconds after launch. (Eight IDCSP satellites were destroyed in the mishap.)

Another Titan IIIC was launched from Complex 40 on 3 November 1966, and it boosted a modified Gemini 2 spacecraft and three secondary satellites into orbit during a largely successful experimental mission on that date. Since the Air Force intended to use Complex 40 for its Manned Orbiting Laboratory (MOL) flights. The MOL was cancelled in June 1969.

Complex 41 eventually supported all the Titan IIIC missions launched from the Cape between the beginning of 1967 and the end of the decade. It was used by Titan IIIC rockets for a Project Viking simulator mission and a Project Helios solar mission in 1974, two NASA Project Viking (Viking 1, Viking 2) missions to Mars in 1975, another Project Helios mission in 1976, and two NASA Voyager program (Voyager 1, Voyager 2) missions to the outer planets in 1977.

A Defense Support Program (DSP) mission had just been launched from Complex 40 on 6 November 1970, but the payload failed to achieve proper orbit. (The spacecraft's operational potential was reduced as a result.) The next Titan IIIC vehicle and its DSP payload were assembled and checked out for a launch on 5 May 1971. The launch on 5 May was successful, and the payload was placed in a synchronous earth orbit as planned. That flight marked the 16th Titan IIIC mission in the 6555th Test Group's history.

On 2 November 1971, the Air Force and its contractors launched the first two Phase II Defense Satellite Communications Program (DSCP) satellites into near synchronous equatorial orbits from Complex 40. That Titan IIIC mission was successful, and it marked the first in a series of classified flights destined to replace Phase I DSCP satellites that had been launched from the Cape between 16 June 1966 and 14 June 1968. On 1 March 1972, a Titan IIIC carrying a 1,800-pound DSP satellite was launched successfully from Complex 40. Eight days later, a Titan IIIC core vehicle (C-24) arrived via C-5A Galaxy aircraft, and it was erected at the VIB on 16 March 1972. It was launched successfully on 12 June 1973.

Titan IIIC launches continued throughout the 1970s when Launch Vehicle C-37 and a twin-DSCS payload. The Launch CST was run on 12 November 1979. Regarding the launch itself, there was one unscheduled five-minute hold during C-37's launch countdown on 20 November. The countdown resumed without further incident, and the Titan IIIC lifted off Complex 40 on the 20th at 2110:00 Eastern Standard Time. Both Phase II DSCS communications satellites were placed in their proper near synchronous orbits, and the mission was a complete success. The last vehicle launched under the Titan IIIC program was Launch Vehicle C-38. It arrived at the Cape on 24 October 1979, and it was the last of 36 Titan IIICs launched from the Cape between 18 June 1965 and the evening of 6 March 1982. After two years of testing, storage and retesting, C-38 was launched on a classified mission on 6 March 1982 at 1425:00 Eastern Standard Time. The flight marked the end of an era at the Cape.

Complex 41 was refurbished for the Titan IV program during the last half of the 1980s, but its first Titan IV launch did not take place until 14 June 1989—almost 12 years after it was used to launch the Voyager program missions to the outer planets.

==== Titan 34D (1980–1989) ====
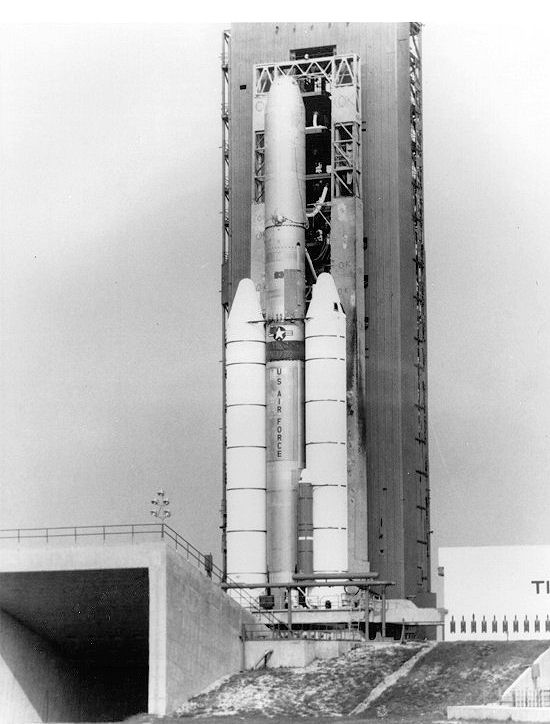
First Titan 34D at Complex 40, 1980

As the last Titan IIIC thundered skyward, Martin Marietta and the Test Group were completing their second year of preparations for the Titan 34D's first launch. The effort began in earnest when the first Titan 34D core vehicle (D-01) arrived at the Cape in March 1980. Baseline CSTs were completed in September 1980, and, apart from a brief roundtrip ride to the SMAB on 11 November, the core vehicle remained in storage at the VIB until 18 May 1981.

The core vehicle was accepted in August 1981, and it was moved to the SMAB on 18 January 1982. The Titan 34D's operational IUS (IUS-2) arrived at the Cape on 22 December 1981. It was taken to the SMAB, and its assembly was completed there on 8 June 1982. Though the IUS' preplanned acceptance testing was completed on 19 August, its formal acceptance was delayed pending additional tests required by Space Division. The IUS was mated to the launch vehicle on 1 September 1982, and it was mated to the vehicle's DSCS II/III payload on 29 September. Acceptance testing was completed on 2 October, and the vehicle was prepared for launch.

Launch Vehicle D-01's first Launch CST was aborted on 20 October 1982, but its second Launch CST was completed successfully on 21 October. The countdown was picked up smoothly on 29 October at 2055Z (Greenwich Mean Time), and the first TITAN 34D lifted off Complex 40 at 0405:01Z on 30 October 1982. The Titan's flight was virtually flawless, and the IUS placed both DSCS satellites into near-perfect equatorial orbits. With the completion of this first highly successful launch operation, the Cape moved solidly into the Titan 34D era.

All Titan 34D launch operations at Vandenberg and the Cape were suspended following the Titan 34D-9 launch failure in April 1986, but it would be wrong to conclude that the suspension allowed the 6555th Aerospace Test Group and the Air Force's Titan contractors to lapse into a period of inactivity. On the contrary, the space launch recovery effort and TITAN IV program initiatives kept the Test Group's agenda full. The Test Group supervised the initial recovery effort at the Cape. As part of that program, a Non-Destructive Testing (NDT) X-Ray facility was constructed in the ITL Area for the purpose of inspecting Titan solid rockets for flaws in propellant, restrictors, insulation and podding compounds. Construction of the NDT facility began on 1 October 1986, and solid rocket motor testing was conducted there as part of the Titan 34D recovery effort from 23 December 1986 through 12 June 1987.

The last Titan 34D launched from the Cape had an extensive processing history between the time it first arrived at the Cape (e.g., 19 August 1981) and the time it was erected for the final time on Transporter No. 3 in Cell No. 1 on 13 December 1988. The transtage was erected on the core vehicle on 28 March 1989. The Acceptance CST was completed successfully on 23 June 1989. Core Vehicle D-2 was moved to the SMAB for solid rocket mating on 2 July, and Launch Vehicle D-2 was moved out to Complex 40 on 5 July 1989. The vehicle was mated to a classified payload and prepared for launch. Though the first Launch CST failed on 21 August, the Launch CST on 27 August was completely successful. A balky Mobile Service Tower delayed pre-launch activities on 4 September, but a 22-minute-long user hold brought operations up to speed at T minus 30 minutes. After the countdown resumed at 0524Z, it proceeded without incident to vehicle lift-off at 0554:01Z on 4 September 1989.

==== Titan IV (1988–1990) ====
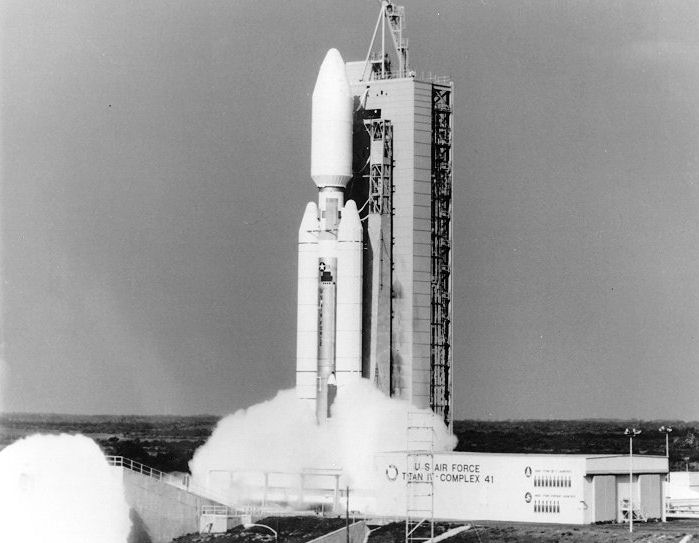
First Titan IV Launch from LC 41, 14 June 1989

As TITAN 34D launch operations continued, the first Titan IV liquid rocket engines were installed on the Titan IV "pathfinder" vehicle at the end of January 1988, shortly before the core vehicle was erected in the VIB. Four Titan IV solid rocket motor segments were received at the SMAB by the middle of February 1988, and two electrical functional tests were conducted in early March. As "bugs" were worked out of various systems, the core vehicle had its first successful CST on 11 May 1988. The vehicle was moved to the SMAB around the middle of May. Following a successful mate with two five-segment stacks of solid rocket motor segments, the pathfinder vehicle was moved out to Complex 41 on Saturday, 21 May. The first Titan IV vehicle supported a classified mission. Its launch had been scheduled for 7 June 1989, but the lift-off was pushed to 14 June due to a range timing generator problem and a computer malfunction. The countdown was picked up at 0254Z on 14 June. Two unscheduled holds were called to let the launch team catch up on checklist items that were behind schedule, and another hold was called for a high temperature reading on the vehicle's S-Band transmitter. Following the last unscheduled hold, the countdown proceeded uneventfully, and the Titan IV lifted off Complex 41 at 1318:01Z on 14 June 1989.

==== Navstar Global Positioning System and development of the Delta II (1978–1990) ====
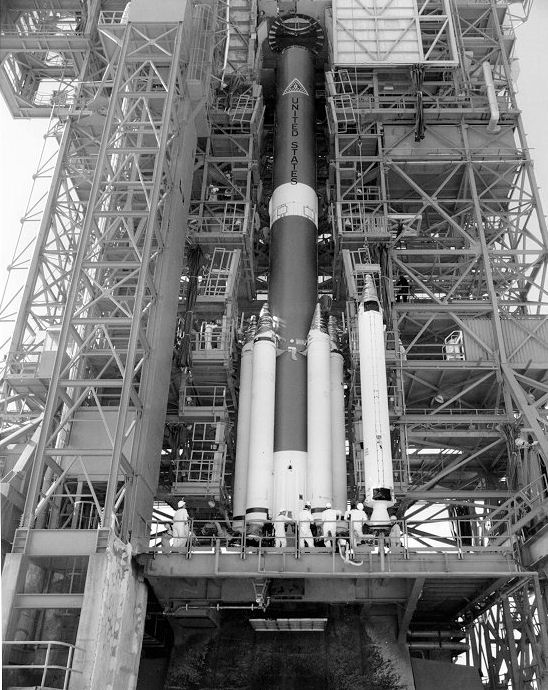
First Delta II at Pad 17A – November 1988

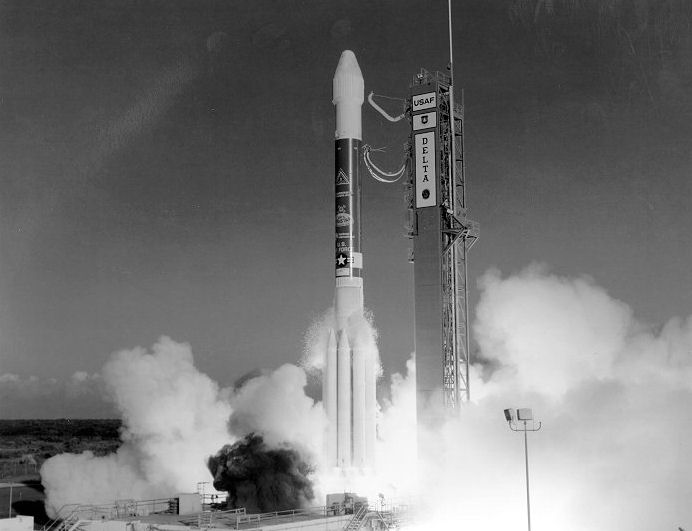
First Delta II Model 7925 launch – 26 November 1990

The Navstar Global Positioning System (GPS) program opened up a whole new field for space support operations at the Cape in the 1980s: the launching of satellites to provide highly accurate three-dimensional ground, sea and air navigation. The U.S. Navy and Air Force began the effort in the early 1960s with a series of studies and experiments dealing with the feasibility of using satellite-generated radio signals to improve the effectiveness of military navigation. After ten years of extensive research, the services concluded that Defense Department requirements would be best served by a single, highly precise, satellite-based Global Positioning System (GPS). In December 1973, the Defense Navigation Satellite System (later known as Navstar GPS) entered its concept validation phase.

The technology necessary to field the GPS was confirmed during that phase, and four advanced development model Block I Navstar satellites were launched on converted SM-65F Atlas boosters from Vandenberg's Space Launch Complex 3 (East) between 22 February and 11 December 1978. Two more Block I satellites (Navstar 5 and Navstar 6) were launched on converted SM-65F Atlas boosters from Vandenberg Complex 3 (East) on 9 February and 26 April 1980. By the end of 1980, the Navstar GPS constellation was arranged in two orbital planes of three satellites each, orbiting Earth at an altitude of approximately 10,900 nautical miles. Following the GPS development phase in the early 1980s, the Air Force planned to procure and deploy a constellation of 24 Block II GPS satellites via Space Shuttle launches by the end of 1987. Funding cuts in 1980 and 1981 reduced the planned constellation to 18 Block II satellites and added a year to their deployment, but the program continued to move ahead.

A Block I replenishment satellite was launched on a converted SM-65E Atlas booster from Vandenberg Complex 3 (East) on 18 December 1981. Unfortunately, a hot gas generator on one of the Atlas booster's main engines failed shortly after lift-off, and the vehicle crashed about 150 yards from the pad. The next replenishment satellite launch was postponed while Atlas engines were refurbished and test-fired in 1982, but the mission was finally launched successfully from Vandenberg Complex 3 (West) on 14 July 1983. The satellite (Navstar 8) replaced Navstar I in the 240-degree orbital plane of the GPS constellation. The last three Block I satellite missions (Navstars 9, 10 and 11) were launched on converted SM-65E Atlas boosters from Complex 3 (West) on 13 June 1984, 8 September 1984 and 8 October 1985. All three launches were successful, and the satellites performed as planned. Testing of the first Block II satellite was well underway in 1985, but the Navstar II satellite program was already markedly behind schedule. By the fall of 1985, the first Block II mission had to be rescheduled from October 1986 to January 1987.

Following the Space Shuttle Challenger disaster in January 1986, the GPS Program Office replanned the first eight Block II satellites for flights on the new Delta II expendable Medium Launch Vehicle in lieu of the Space Shuttle. Space Division awarded the Medium Launch Vehicle (MLV) contract to McDonnell-Douglas Astronautics Company on 21 January 1987. However, unlike earlier commercial arrangements, the company would no longer be under contract to NASA. Under the new Commercial Expendable Launch Vehicle program encouraged by President Ronald Reagan since 1983, McDonnell-Douglas would be responsible for producing, marketing and launching its commercial Delta IIs. The Air Force would be responsible for ensuring safety and environmental standards for commercial as well as military launches, but McDonnell-Douglas would have greater responsibility in meeting those standards (including quality control). Both launch pads (17A and 17B) would be equipped to handle commercial and Defense Department missions. McDonnell-Douglas and its subcontractors were soon hard at work preparing the pads for the new Delta II vehicles.

Like the Titan and Atlas lines of launch vehicles, the Delta II line was built on major components supplied by several different contractors. McDonnell-Douglas built the basic core vehicle and supplied fairing materials at its plant in Huntington Beach, California, but it shipped them to another plant in Pueblo, Colorado for further assembly and/or match-ups with other contractors' components. Rocketdyne provided the Delta's main engine, and Aerojet supplied the vehicle's second stage engine. Delco supplied the inertial guidance system, and Morton Thiokol built the strap-on solid rocket motors used for the basic Model 6925 Delta II vehicle. The first and second stages were transported to the Horizontal Processing Facility (HPF) in Area 55 for destruct system installation. Following processing at the HPF, both stages were moved to Complex 17 and erected. At Complex 17, the entire process came together to create a complete Delta II launch vehicle.

Unfortunately, trouble loomed from a different quarter in July 1988: McDonnell-Douglas ran into trouble getting some fiber optic equipment it ordered for Pad 17A, and the first Delta II launch was rescheduled from 13 October 1988 to 8 December 1988. Following additional delays and pre-launch tests, the countdown was begun on 12 February 1989, but it was scrubbed at 1827Z due to excessive high altitude winds. The countdown was picked up again on 14 February, and lift-off was recorded at 1829:59.988Z on 14 February 1989. The first Delta II placed the first Navstar II GPS payload into the proper transfer orbit. The mission was a success.

Following the first Navstar II GPS mission on 14 February 1989, the GPS Program Office hoped to have five Navstar II satellites in orbit by the end of September, but only three of those spacecraft had been launched by that time. Since twelve Block II satellites would be needed to give the GPS constellation its first worldwide two-dimensional navigation capability, planners estimated that capability could not be achieved before the spring of 1991. In point of fact, six more Navstar II satellites were launched over the next year.

Iraq's invasion of Kuwait in August 1990 provided additional incentive for McDonnell-Douglas and the Air Force to rise to the challenge. Navstar II-9 (the last of the six Navstars mentioned) lifted off on 1 October 1990, and it was placed in orbit over the Middle East. The satellite's on-orbit testing program was completed in record time, and Navstar II-9 was turned over to Air Force Space Command on 24 October 1990. Navstar II-10 was launched successfully on 26 November 1990. With II-10 in operation, the GPS network provided two-dimensional coordinates with an average accuracy of 4.5 meters during Operation Desert Storm. The Navstar system's three-dimensional accuracy averaged 8.3 meters during the war. The GPS Program Office hoped to launch five Block IIA Navstar spacecraft by October 1991, but component problems associated with the new design caused lengthy delays. Only two Block IIA missions were launched by October 1991, but five more Block IIA launches were completed by the end of 1992. The constellation was well on its way to full operational status by the beginning of 1993.

=== Space Shuttle military missions ===
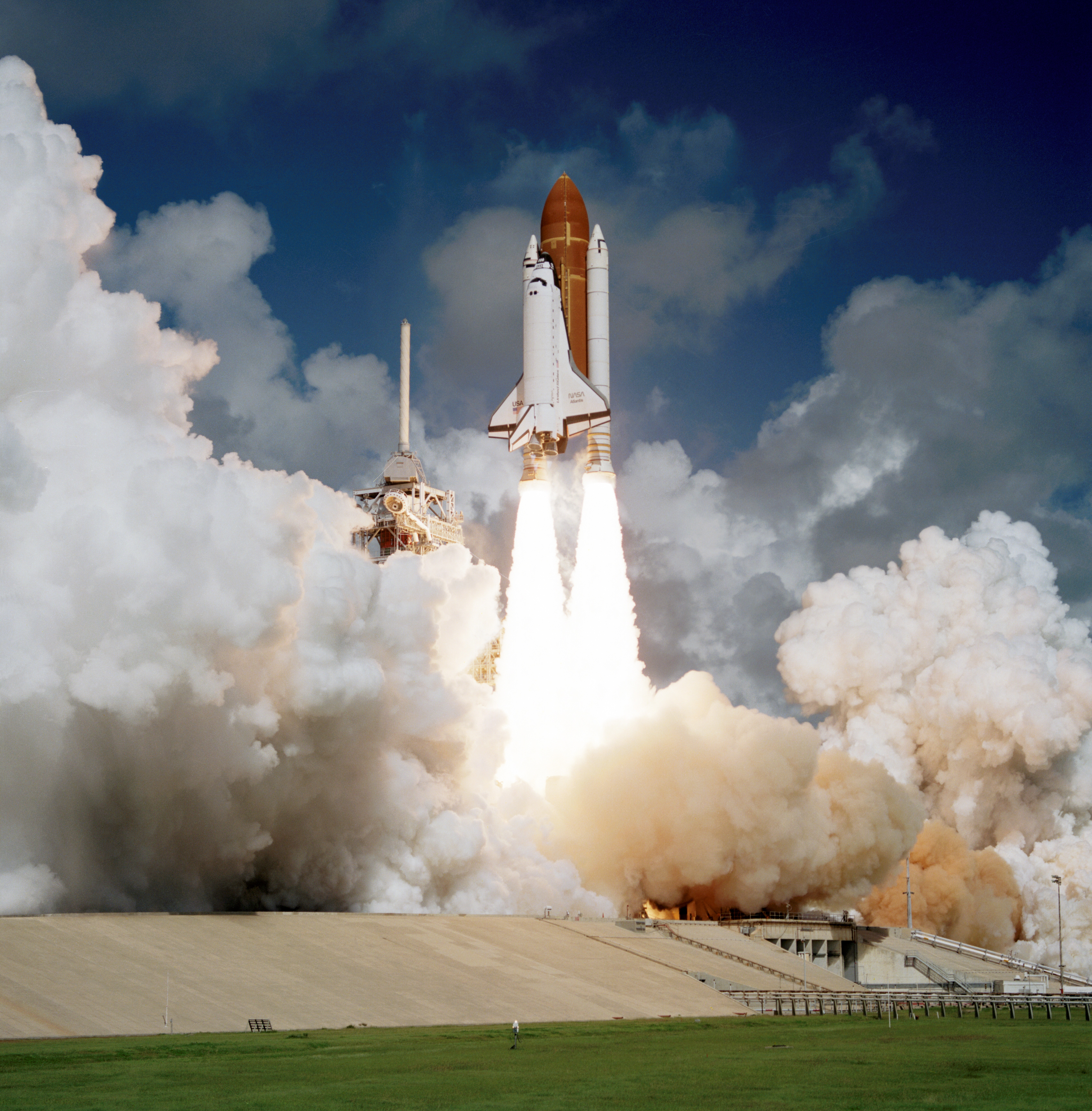
Launch of OV-104 Atlantis 3 October 1985 on STS-51-J

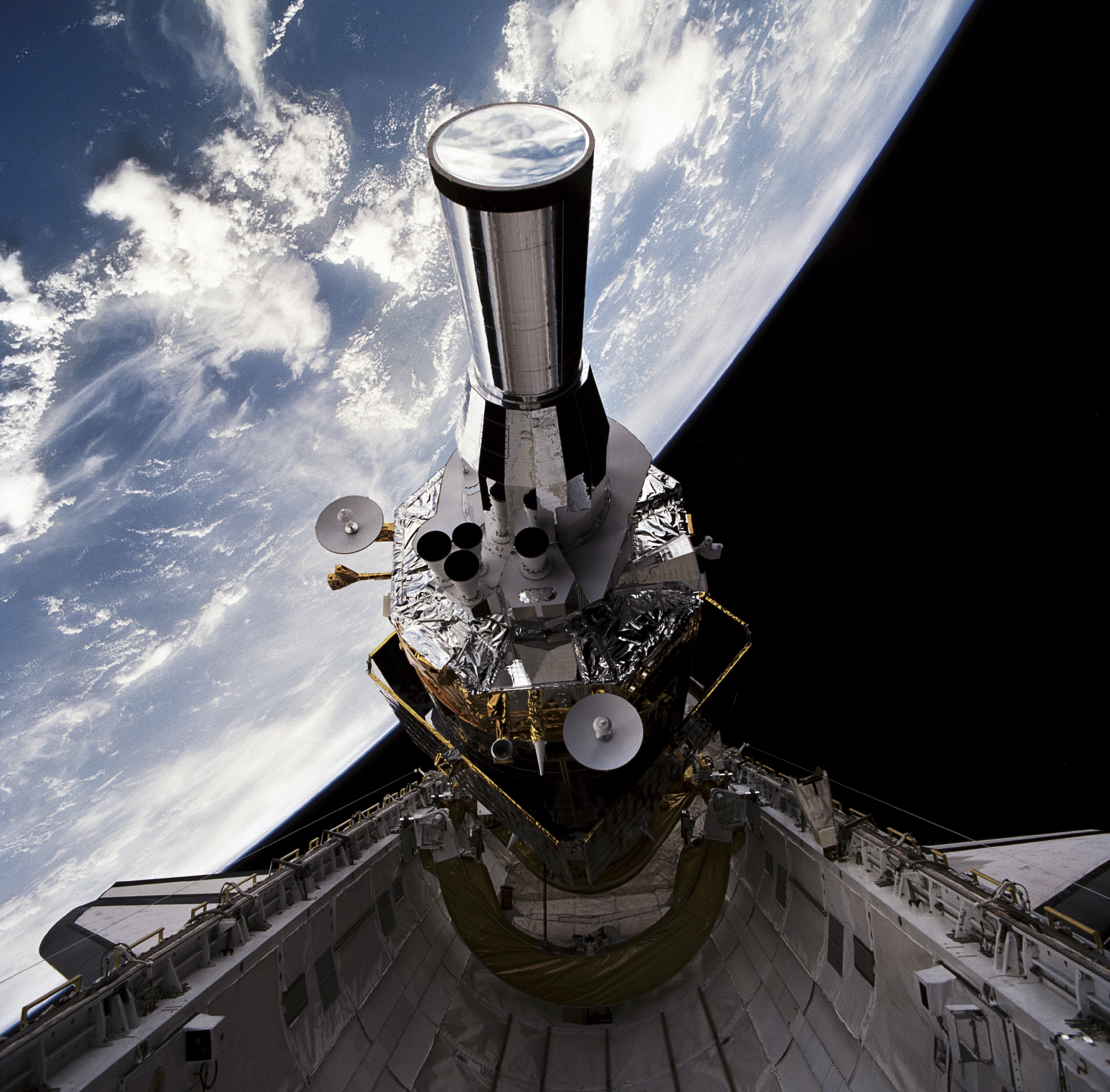
STS-44 Defense Support Program (DSP) deployment, 24 November 1991

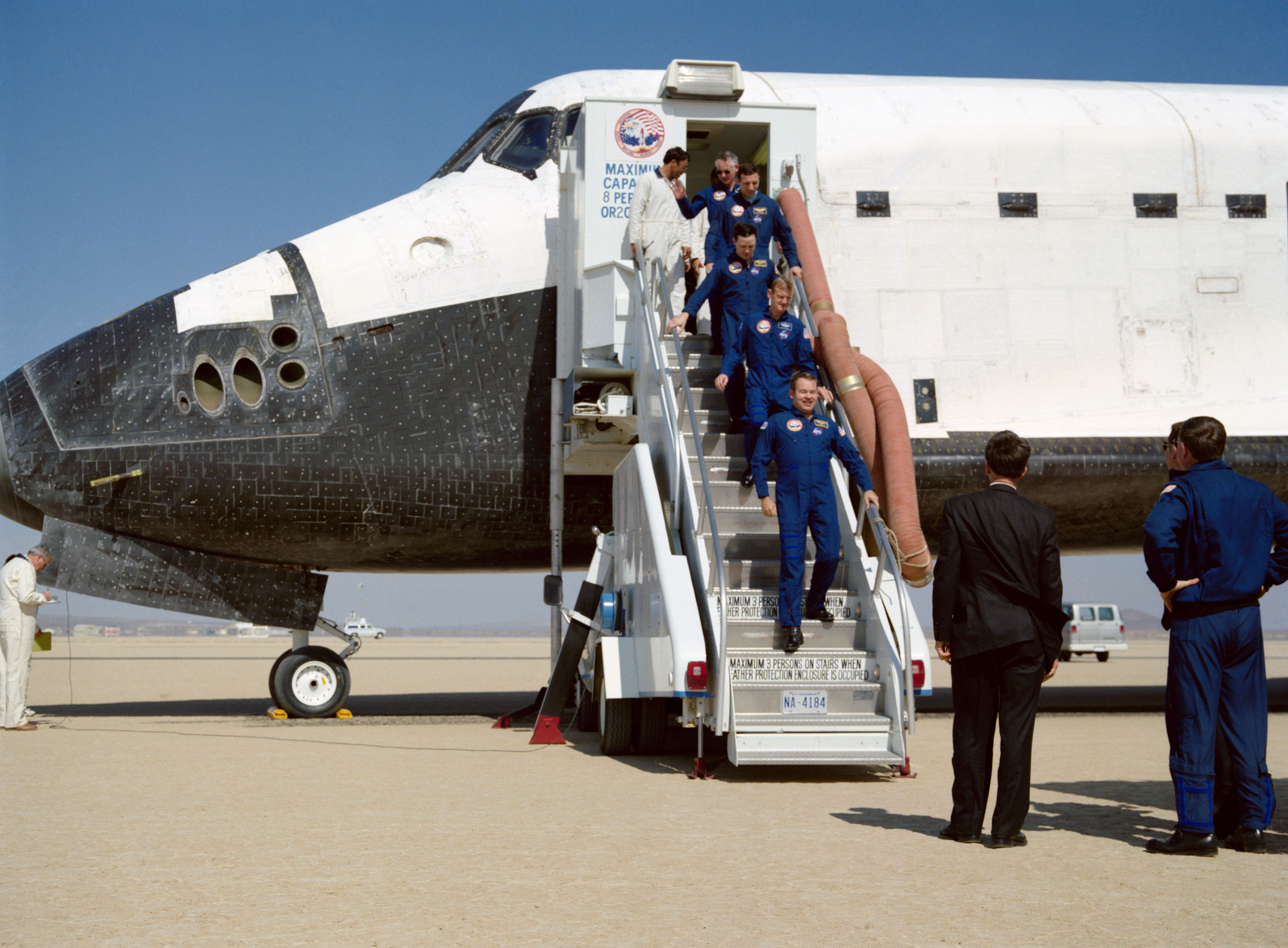
STS-36 crewmembers egress Atlantis, Orbiter Vehicle (OV) 104, 4 March 1990 via mobile stairway following touchdown on Runway 23 drylake bed at Edwards Air Force Base (EAFB), California.

The 6555th Aerospace Test Group established its Space Transportation System (STS) Division on 1 July 1974. The division was created to ensure that Defense Department requirements were included in plans for future Space Shuttle operations at the NASA Kennedy Space Center (KSC).

As two of its earliest accomplishments, the division got NASA to agree to the Defense Department's requirement for vertical payload installations at the Shuttle launch pad and a secure conference area in the Firing Room of the Shuttle Launch Control Center (LCC). The division continued to serve as an intermediary between KSC and the Defense Department payload community. The division not only gave the payload community a better understanding of schedule and contractual constraints affecting KSC ground operations, it also gathered a more detailed set of requirements from military payload programs to help NASA support those programs.

The division also helped the 6595th Space Test Group develop requirements for a Shuttle Launch Processing System at Vandenberg Air Force Base. The division also provided selection criteria and background information to help the Space and Missile Systems Organization select its Shuttle payload integration contractor. Martin Marietta was awarded the Shuttle payload integration contract on 15 September 1977.

As preparations for military space shuttle operations continued, the STS Division identified and analyzed many problems associated with "factory-to-pad" processing of military payloads. The division's findings helped justify the need for an off-line Shuttle Payload Integration Facility (SPIF), and they convinced the AFSC Commander to approve the SMAB's west bay as the site for the SPIF in January 1979. As work on the SPIF got underway, the 6555th Aerospace Test Group formed the STS/IUS Site Activation Team in September 1981 to address problems associated with the first IUS processed aboard the Shuttle. The STS Division and the Satellite Systems Division were consolidated to form the Spacecraft Division on 1 November 1983.

The first Space Shuttle mission that included a military task, STS-4, was launched from Pad 39A at 1500Z on 27 June 1982. Part its payload was being used by the U.S. Air Force for a classified mission. Military space missions also accounted for part or all of 14 out of 37 Shuttle flights launched from the Cape between August 1984 and July 1992. While many details of those missions are not releasable, some features of Shuttle payload ground processing operations and range support requirements can be summarized for what might be termed a "typical" military space mission.

One process common to many military Shuttle missions was the preparation of the Inertial Upper Stage (IUS). Though the ultimate destination of the IUS was mission-specific, the IUS was processed in one of two basic assembly/checkout flows (i.e., one for military payloads and the other for NASA spacecraft). Before either process began, the Inertial Upper Stage's structural assemblies, avionics and flight batteries were received at hangars E and H and placed in various storage areas at the Cape. At the appropriate time, all vehicle elements were transferred to the SMAB, where they were assembled and checked out. Following power up checks and functional testing, the military IUS was cleaned and transferred to the SPIF. For civilian missions, IUSs entered a different assembly/checkout flow at this point in the process. They were sent directly to NASA's Vertical Processing Facility on Merritt Island.

- STS-4 OV-102 Columbia (27 June-4 July 1982)

The first Shuttle/DOD payload arrived at the Cape in April 1982. It was processed by an Air Force/NASA/contractor team, and it was loaded aboard the Shuttle Columbia as the vehicle stood on Pad 39A. Navy Captain Thomas K. Mattingly II, an active-duty naval officer, later described the classified payload – two sensors for detecting missile launches – as a "rinky-dink collection of minor stuff they wanted to fly." The payload failed to operate. Following an 87-hour countdown, Columbia lifted off at 1500:00Z on 27 June 1982. Mattingly and Air Force Colonel Henry W. Hartsfield, Jr. conducted the military mission in addition to several civilian experiments while "on-orbit." and the long-term effects of temperature changes on Shuttle subsystems were studied along with a survey of orbiter-induced contamination in the Shuttle's payload bay. Columbia made a hard runway landing at Edwards Air Force Base at 1609:00Z on 4 July 1982.

- STS-41-D OV-103 Discovery (30 August-5 September 1984)

The first of five operational SYNCOM IV military communications satellites was launched on Discovery's maiden flight on 30 August 1984. The flight supported a mixed DOD/civilian mission, and Discovery's on-orbit agenda included the deployment of two civilian satellites (e.g., AT&T's TELSTAR 3-C and Satellite Business Systems' SBS-D) and a solar array experiment (OAST-1).

- STS-51-A OV-103 Discovery (8–16 November 1984)

Mission 51-A was Discovery's second voyage into space, and it featured a military spacecraft among its payloads. The lift-off was scheduled for 7 November 1984, but upper level wind shear delayed the launch until 8 November. Discovery was launched from Pad 39A at 1215:00Z on 8 November 1984. The ANIK D2 satellite was deployed successfully at 2104Z on 9 November, and the military payload-SYNCOM IV-was deployed successfully at 1256Z on 10 November. The rendezvous and satellite capture sequences were completed successfully over the next four days in space, and Discovery landed at KSC's Shuttle Landing Facility at 1200:01Z on 16 November 1984.

- STS-51-C OV-103 Discovery (24–27 January 1985)

The first all-military Shuttle mission was originally scheduled for launch on 8 December 1984, it did not lift off until 24 January 1985. Captain Thomas K. Mattingly, II was selected to command Discovery on the highly classified mission. The launch was delayed on 23 January due to weather, and cold weather held up cryogenic fueling operations for two hours on the 24th. Those delays aside, the last four hours of the countdown proceeded smoothly, and Discovery lifted off Pad 39A at 1950:00Z on 24 January 1985. Details of the mission are not releasable, it is believed that a Magnum 1 reconnaissance satellite was released using an Inertial Upper Stage (IUS) solid-fueled booster rocket. Discovery landed at KSC at 2123:24Z on 27 January 1985.

- STS-51-D OV-103 Discovery (12–19 April 1985)

The third SYNCOM IV spacecraft was deployed along with Telesat Canada's Anik-C satellite during Discovery's mission in mid-April 1985. Discovery lifted off Pad 39A at 1359:05Z on 12 April 1985. Discovery's crew deployed the Anik-C satellite successfully on the first day of the mission, and the SYNCOM IV was deployed on Day 2. Unfortunately, the SYNCOM IV's perigee kick motor failed to fire, and two more days were added to the mission to allow a rendezvous and an improvised restart of the spacecraft. Two "flyswatter" devices were attached to the Shuttle's Remote Manipulating System (RMS) to allow the crew to depress the SYNCOM IV's timer switch. Despite a successful rendezvous and a switch reset on Day 6, the attempt failed. The SYNCOM IV spacecraft was left in orbit to be retrieved and redeployed in early September 1985. Discovery landed at KSC's Shuttle Landing Facility at 1355:37Z on 19 April 1985.

- STS-51-I OV-103 Discovery (27 August-3 September 1985)

Discovery's sixth trip into space was launched in late August 1985. The countdown was started again at 0205Z on 27 August, and it proceeded smoothly except for a three-minute extension in a built-in hold to clear traffic in a solid rocket booster retrieval area. Discovery lifted off Pad 39A at 1058:01Z on 27 August 1985. The AUSSAT-1 spacecraft was ejected from the orbiter's cargo bay at 1733Z on the 27th, and the satellite's deployment and perigee kick motor burns were both successful. The ASC-1 deployment and boost were also successful on Day 1 of the mission. The SYNCOM IV-4 deployment went extremely well on Day 3, and Discovery's crew prepared for their rendezvous with the wayward SYNCOM IV-3 spacecraft on Day 5. The spacecraft was retrieved and repairs were completed on the satellite on Day 6 of the mission. SYNCOM IV-3 was redeployed at 1512Z on 1 September 1985. Unlike its earlier performance in April, the spacecraft began sending good telemetry data to ground stations shortly thereafter. Discovery landed on Edwards' Runway 23 at 1315Z on 3 September 1985.

- STS-51-J OV-104 Atlantis (3–7 October 1985)

The Shuttle Atlantis' maiden flight was completed in early October 1985, and it was dedicated to a highly classified military mission. Atlantis was launched from Pad 39A at 1515:30Z on 3 October 1985. Details of the mission remain classified, it is believed that two DSCS-III B4 and DSCS-III B5 were launched using an IUS booster from the shuttle. Atlantis landed on Edwards' Runway 23 at 1700Z on 7 October.

- STS-27 OV-104 Atlantis (2–7 December 1988)

The Shuttle's next military mission was put on hold after the Challenger disaster, but it was carried out by Atlantis between 2 and 7 December 1988. The mission was highly classified, so most details are not releasable. Though the countdown was picked up at 0230Z on 1 December, upper level wind shear effects delayed the launch until 2 December. The countdown was picked up again on 2 December, but a problem with a ground feed liquid oxygen valve required a 50-minute unscheduled hold at T minus 180 minutes. Wind shear problems forced another delay at T minus nine minutes for an additional 99 minutes, but the final unscheduled hold (at T minus 31 seconds) only lasted 71 seconds. Atlantis lifted off Pad 39B at 1430:34Z on 2 December. The Shuttle landed at Edwards Air Force Base at 2336:11Z on 6 December 1988.

- STS-28 OV-102 Columbia (8–13 August 1989)

Columbia was pressed into service to support her second military space mission in August 1989. Once again, the mission was highly classified, so only a few details are releasable. The countdown got underway on 8 August 1989. A user data link problem delayed the countdown for approximately 70 minutes during a built-in hold, but the count proceeded normally after that incident. Columbia lifted off Pad 39B at 1237:00 on 8 August 1989. In addition to deploying their military payload successfully, Columbia's crew conducted several on-orbit experiments during the five-day mission. The Shuttle landed on Edwards' Runway 22 at 1337Z on 13 August 1989.

- STS-33 OV-103 Discovery (23–28 November 1989)

Discovery was launched on her second all-military Shuttle mission in late November 1989. The countdown on 23 November proceeded uneventfully until T minus five minutes, when a three-minute and thirty-second hold was called to let the user complete checklist items. The countdown resumed, and Discovery lifted off Pad 39B at 0023:30Z on 23 November 1989. It is believed that a Magnum 2 reconnaissance satellite was released using an Inertial Upper Stage (IUS) solid-fueled booster rocket. Though Discovery's landing was delayed until 27 November due to high winds over Edwards Air Force Base, the Shuttle made a successful landing on Runway 4 at 0030Z on 28 November 1989.

- STS-32 OV-102 Columbia (9–20 January 1990)

Columbia's ninth space mission was a mixed military/civilian operation. The mission had three main objectives: 1) deploy the fifth SYNCOM IV military satellite, 2) retrieve the Long Duration Exposure Facility (LDEF) deployed by the Shuttle Challenger in early April 1984, and 3) conduct a variety of experiments in the Shuttle's middeck area. A launch attempt on 8 January 1990 was scrubbed due to weather, but the countdown on 9 January proceeded smoothly, and Columbia was launched from Complex 39A at 1235:00Z on 9 January 1990. The SYNCOM IV-5 spacecraft was deployed successfully at 1318Z on 10 January, and Columbia rendezvoused with the LDEF on 12 January. All middeck experiments were underway by the end of Day 2 of the mission. Though the Shuttle's landing was delayed a day for weather, Columbia landed safely on Edwards' Runway 22 at 0935:38Z on 20 January 1990.

- STS-36 OV-104 Atlantis (28 February-4 March 1990)

Atlantis lifted off Pad 39A on another all-military Shuttle mission at 0750:22Z on 28 February 1990. Though details of the mission remain classified, the flight was successful. Atlantis landed on Edwards' Runway 23 at 1808:44Z on 4 March 1990.

- STS-38 OV-103 Discovery (15–20 November 1990)

Atlantis flew another all-military Shuttle mission in November 1990. The launch was originally planned for the summer of 1990, but it was delayed after hydrogen leaks were found in the Atlantis and Columbia orbiters. (Atlantis was rolled back to the VAB for repair toward the end of July 1990.) A new mission execution order (90–7) was implemented on 21 October 1990, and it announced a tentative launch date of 10 November 1990. The countdown was picked up on 15 November at 1340Z, and it proceeded smoothly to a built-in hold at T minus 9 minutes. That hold was extended two minutes and 34 seconds to allow the user to catch up on checklist items, and the countdown proceeded to lift-off at 2348:15Z on 15 November 1990. The mission was highly classified, so on-orbit details are not releasable. It is believed that a Magnum 3 reconnaissance satellite was released using an Inertial Upper Stage (IUS) solid-fueled booster rocket. Atlantis' crew planned to land at Edwards Air Force Base on 19 November, but strong winds delayed the landing and forced NASA to divert the orbiter to KSC's Shuttle Landing Facility instead. Atlantis landed on KSC Runway 33 at 2142:43Z on 20 November 1990.

- STS-39 OV-103 Discovery (28 April- May 1991)

Discovery's SDI mission featured two deployable payloads, three orbiter bay payloads and two middeck experiments. The Infrared Background Signature Survey (IBSS) was on board to help define SDI systems and gather infrared data on Shuttle exhaust plumes, Earthlimb and aurora phenomena, chemical/gas releases and celestial infrared sources. It consisted of two deployable hardware elements (e.g., the Shuttle Pallet Satellite II and a collection of three Chemical Release Observation sub-satellites) and a non-deployable Critical Ionization Velocity element. The Air Force Program 675 payload was included on the mission to gather infrared, ultraviolet and x-ray data on auroral, Earthlimb and celestial sources. It consisted of five experiments mounted on a pallet in the Shuttle payload bay. The Space Test Payload-1 (STP-1) was a secondary payload consisting of five experiments designed to gather data on: 1) fluid management in weightless conditions, 2) MILVAX computer and erasable optical disk performance in weightless conditions, 3) atomic oxygen glow effects, 4) free particles present in the Shuttle payload bay during flight ascent and 5) the upper atmosphere's composition. The Cloud Logic to Optimize Use of Defense Systems (CLOUDS) experiment used a 36-exposure camera to photograph clouds and correlate cloud characteristics with their impact on the efficiency of military surveillance systems. The hand-held Radiation Monitoring Equipment III (RME III) sensor was included on the mission in one of a continuing series of experiments to collect data on gamma radiation aboard the Shuttle. With Discovery safely in low-Earth orbit, the crew set about completing the mission. The SPAS II was deployed at 0928Z on 1 May 1991. Though problems with the onboard Sun sensor forced cancellation of the first exhaust plume observation, other observations went well later in the day. NASA was reportedly "very pleased" with the results. The AFP-675 payload's experiments went well, and 31 of 33 individual experiments were completed by the time the Shuttle's Remote Manipulating System retrieved the SPAS II at 1445Z on 3 May. Following another day of Earth observations, the SPAS II was returned to the payload bay and stowed. Discovery's deorbit burn occurred around 1750Z on 6 May, and the Shuttle landed at KSC's Runway 15 at 1855Z on the same day.

- STS-44 OV-104 Atlantis (24 November-1 December 1991)

The last military Shuttle mission was flown by Atlantis. The mission execution order (91–7) was implemented on 11 October 1991, but the scheduled launch was delayed for five days in mid-November due to a problem with the payload's IUS. A handful of optics, communications and weather instrumentation problems also cropped up during the countdown on 24 November, and the Range Safety Display System required a reload approximately half an hour before launch. Despite those problems, Atlantis' lift-off from Pad 39A went smoothly at 2344:00Z on 24 November 1991. The primary objective of the mission was to deploy a Defense Support Program (DSP) satellite approximately 6 hours and 18 minutes into the flight. The crew deployed the DSP spacecraft as scheduled at 0603Z on 25 November, but the mission was terminated three days early due to an Inertial Measurement Unit failure aboard the Shuttle. Though a landing at KSC was scheduled, Atlantis was ultimately diverted to Edwards Air Force Base for her landing. Following completion of the deorbit burn at 2131Z, Atlantis touched down on Runway 05 at 2234:42Z on 1 December 1991.

== Lineage ==
- Designated as the 6555th Guided Missile Group (Test and Experimentation) and organized on 15 August 1959

Redesignated 6555th Test Wing (Developmental) on 21 December 1959
Redesignated 6555th Aerospace Test Wing on 25 October 1961
Redesignated 6555th Aerospace Test Group on 1 April 1970
Inactivated on 1 July 1992

=== Assignments ===
- Air Force Missile Test Center, 15 August 1959
- Ballistic Missile Division, 21 December 1959
- Space and Missiles System Organization, 25 October 1961
- Space and Missile Test Center, 1 April 1970
- Eastern Space and Missile Center, 1 October 1979 – 1 July 1992

=== Stations ===
- Patrick Air Force Base, Florida, 15 August 1959 – 1 July 1992

== See also ==
- List of United States Air Force Tactical Missile Squadrons
