= Cape Canaveral Space Force Station =

Military rocket launch site in Florida

- Part of Patrick Space Force Base
- Near Cocoa Beach, Florida in the United States
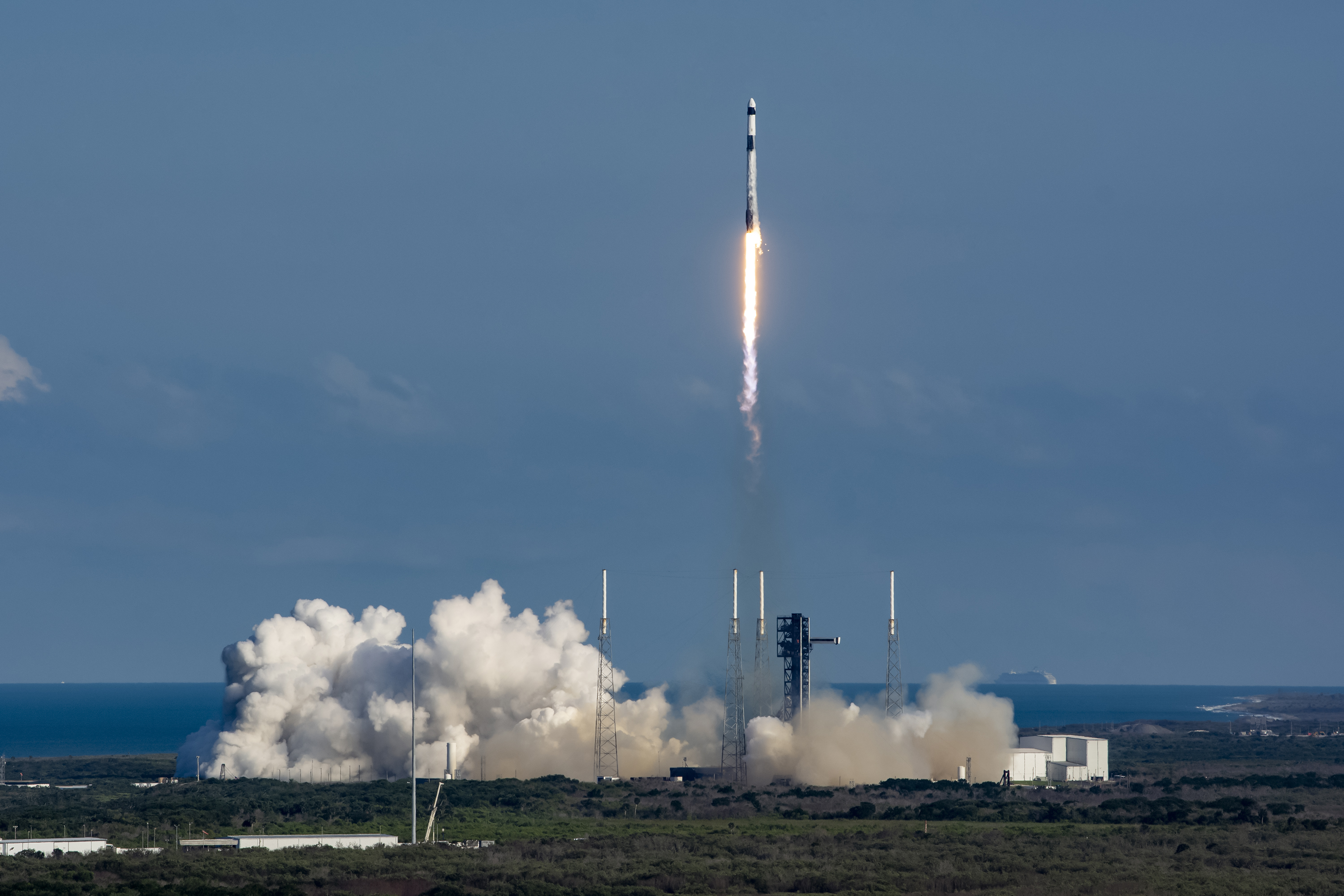
- A Falcon 9 rocket lifts off from SLC-40 in 2026 for the CRS-34 mission.

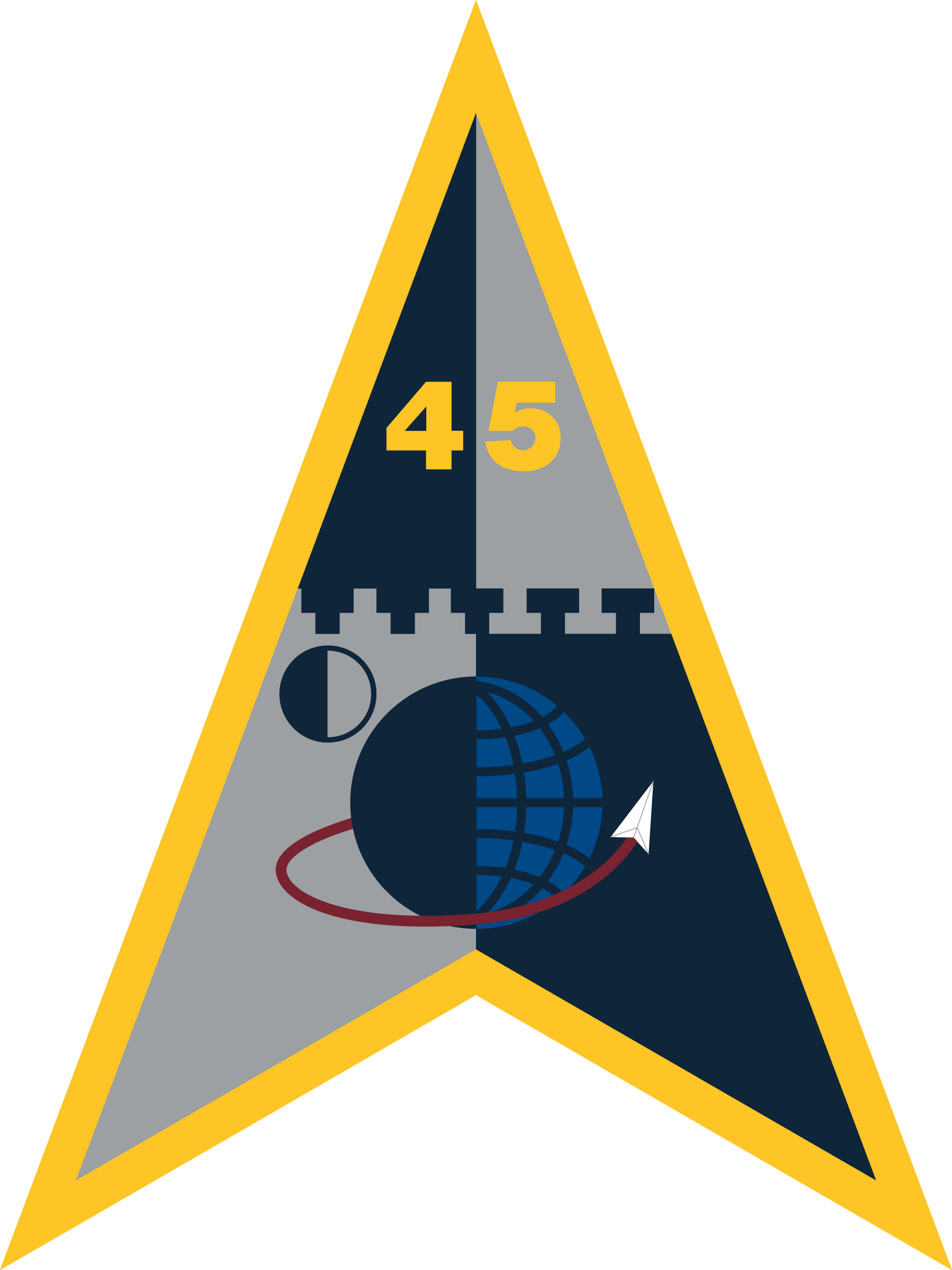
- Emblem of Space Launch Delta 45

Site information
- Type: U.S. Space Force Station
- Owner: Department of Defense
- Operator: United States Space Force
- Controlled by: Space Launch Delta 45
- Condition: Operational
- Website: www.patrick.spaceforce.mil

Location
- Location in the United States
- Coordinates: 28°29′20″N 80°34′40″W
- Area: 16,000 acres (65 km^{2})

Site history
- Built: 1949 (as the Joint Long Range Proving Ground)
- In use: 1949 – present

Garrison information
- Garrison: Space Launch Delta 45

Airfield information
- Identifiers: ICAO: KXMR, FAA LID: XMR
- Elevation: 3 meters (10 ft) AMSL
Runways
Direction	Length and surface
13/31	3,048 meters (10,000 ft)
- Cape Canaveral Space Force Station
- U.S. National Register of Historic Places
- U.S. National Historic Landmark District
- Location: Cape Canaveral, Florida, United States
- Built: 1950+
- Visitation: Public tours available to selected historic sites
- NRHP reference No.: 84003872

Significant dates
- Added to NRHP: April 16, 1984
- Designated NHLD: April 16, 1984

Cape Canaveral Space Force Station (CCSFS) is an installation of the United States Space Force's Space Launch Delta 45, located on Cape Canaveral in Brevard County, Florida.

Headquartered at the nearby Patrick Space Force Base, the station is the primary launch site for the Space Force's Eastern Range with five launch pads currently active (Space Launch Complexes 36, 39, 40, 41 and 46) and a landing pad within SLC-40 complex (Landing Zone 40). The facility is south-southeast of NASA's Kennedy Space Center on adjacent Merritt Island, with the two linked by bridges and causeways. The Cape Canaveral Space Force Station Skid Strip provides a 10,000-foot (3,000 m) runway close to the launch complexes for military airlift aircraft delivering heavy and outsized payloads to the Cape.

A number of American space exploration pioneers were launched from CCSFS, including the first U.S. Earth satellite (1958), first U.S. astronaut (1961), first U.S. astronaut in orbit (1962), first two-man U.S. spacecraft (1965), first U.S. uncrewed lunar landing (1966), and first three-man U.S. spacecraft (1968). It was also the launch site for all of the first spacecraft to (separately) fly past each of the planets in the Solar System (1962–1977), the first spacecraft to orbit Mars (1971) and roam its surface (1996), the first American spacecraft to orbit and land on Venus (1978), the first spacecraft to orbit Saturn (2004), and to orbit Mercury (2011), and the first spacecraft to leave the Solar System (1977). Portions of the base have been designated a National Historic Landmark for their association with the early years of the American space program.

Cape Canaveral was known as Cape Canaveral Launch Area upon its foundation in 1949, but renamed to LRPG Launching Area in 1950. It was known as Cape Canaveral Auxiliary Air Force Base from 1951 to 1955, and Cape Canaveral Missile Test Annex from 1955 to 1964. The facility was known as Cape Kennedy Air Force Station from 1964 to 1974, and as Cape Canaveral Air Force Station from 1974 to 1994 and from 2000 to 2020, taking the designation Cape Canaveral Air Station from 1994 to 2000. The facility was renamed "Cape Canaveral Space Force Station" in December 2020.

== History ==
The CCSFS area had been used by the United States government to test missiles since 1949, when President Harry S. Truman established the Joint Long Range Proving Ground at Cape Canaveral. The location was among the best in the continental United States for this purpose, as it allowed for launches out over the Atlantic Ocean, and is closer to the equator than most other parts of the United States, allowing rockets to get a boost from the Earth's rotation.

=== Air Force Proving Ground ===
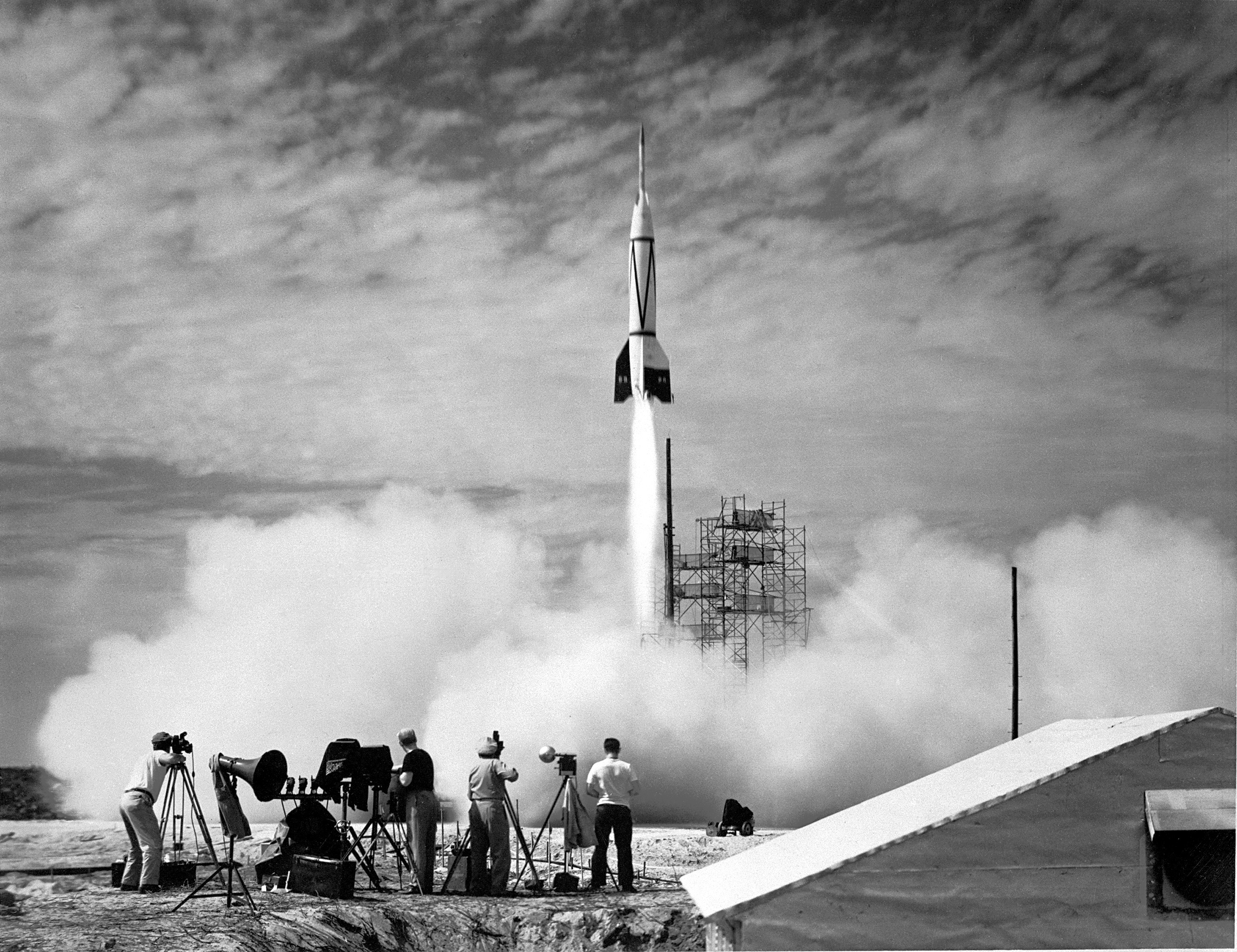
A Bumper V-2 was the first missile launched at Cape Canaveral, on July 24, 1950.

On June 1, 1948, the United States Navy transferred the former Naval Air Station Banana River to the United States Air Force, with the Air Force renaming the facility the Joint Long Range Proving Ground (JLRPG) Base on June 10, 1949. On October 1, 1949, the Joint Long Range Proving Ground Base was transferred from the Air Materiel Command to the Air Force Division of the Joint Long Range Proving Ground. On May 17, 1950, the base was renamed the Long Range Proving Ground Base but three months later was renamed Patrick Air Force Base, in honor of Major General Mason Patrick of the U.S. Army Air Corps. In 1951, the Air Force established the Air Force Missile Test Center.

Early American sub-orbital rocket flights were achieved at Cape Canaveral in 1956. These flights occurred shortly after sub-orbital flights launched from White Sands Missile Range, such as the Viking 12 sounding rocket on February 4, 1955.

Following the Soviet Union's successful Sputnik 1 (launched on October 4, 1957), the United States attempted its first launch of an artificial satellite from Cape Canaveral on December 6, 1957. However, the rocket carrying Vanguard TV-3 exploded on the launch pad.

NASA was founded in 1958, and Air Force crews launched missiles for NASA from the Cape, known then as Cape Canaveral Missile Annex. Redstone, Jupiter, Pershing 1, Pershing 1a, Pershing II, Polaris, Thor, Atlas, Titan and Minuteman missiles were all tested from the site, the Thor becoming the basis for the expendable launch vehicle (ELV) Delta rocket, which launched Telstar 1 in July 1962. The row of Titan (LC-15, 16, 19, 20) and Atlas (LC-11, 12, 13, 14) launch pads along the coast came to be known as Missile Row in the 1960s.

=== Project Mercury ===
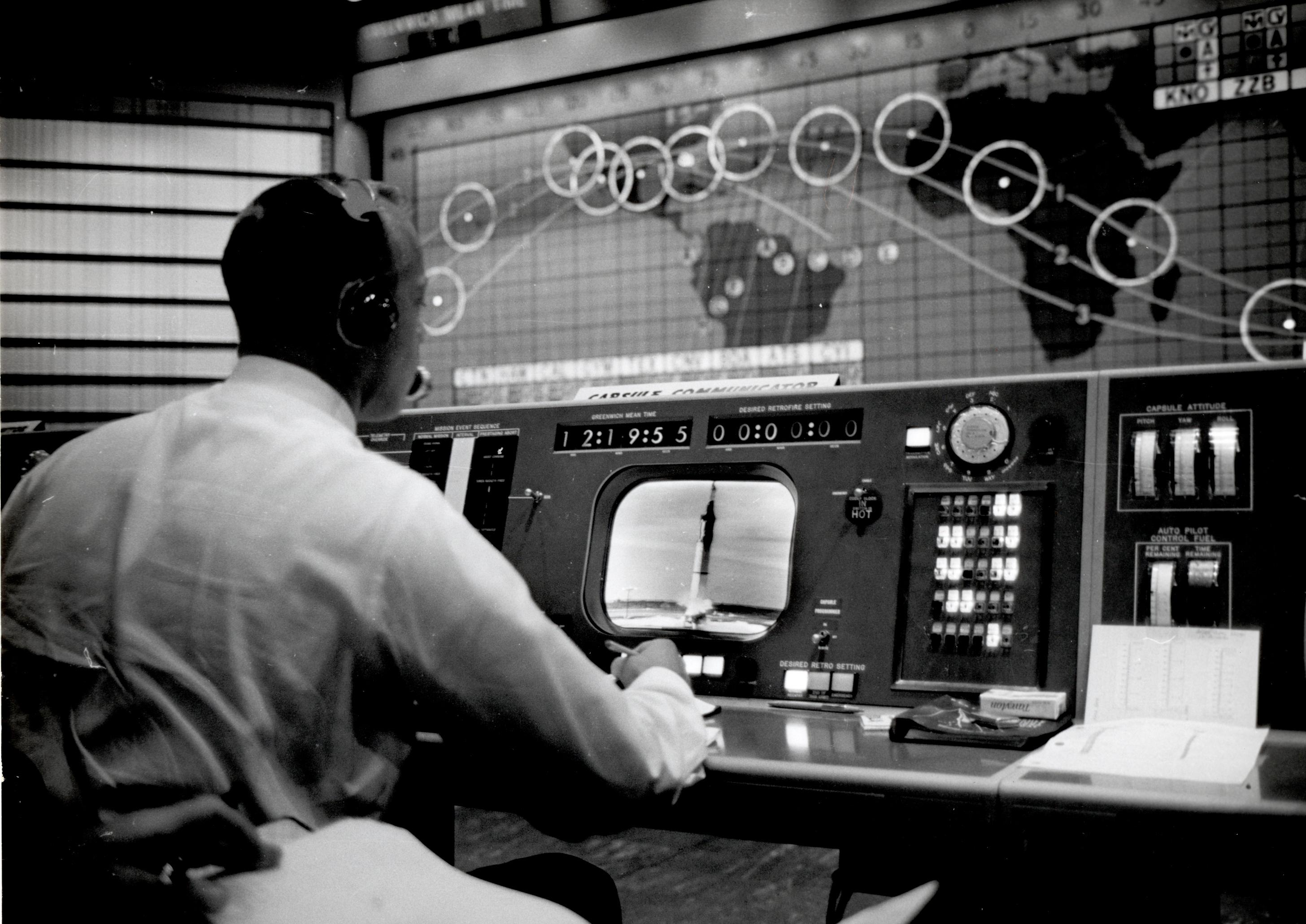
Alan Shepard watches Gus Grissom's Liberty Bell 7 launch in the Mercury Control Center.

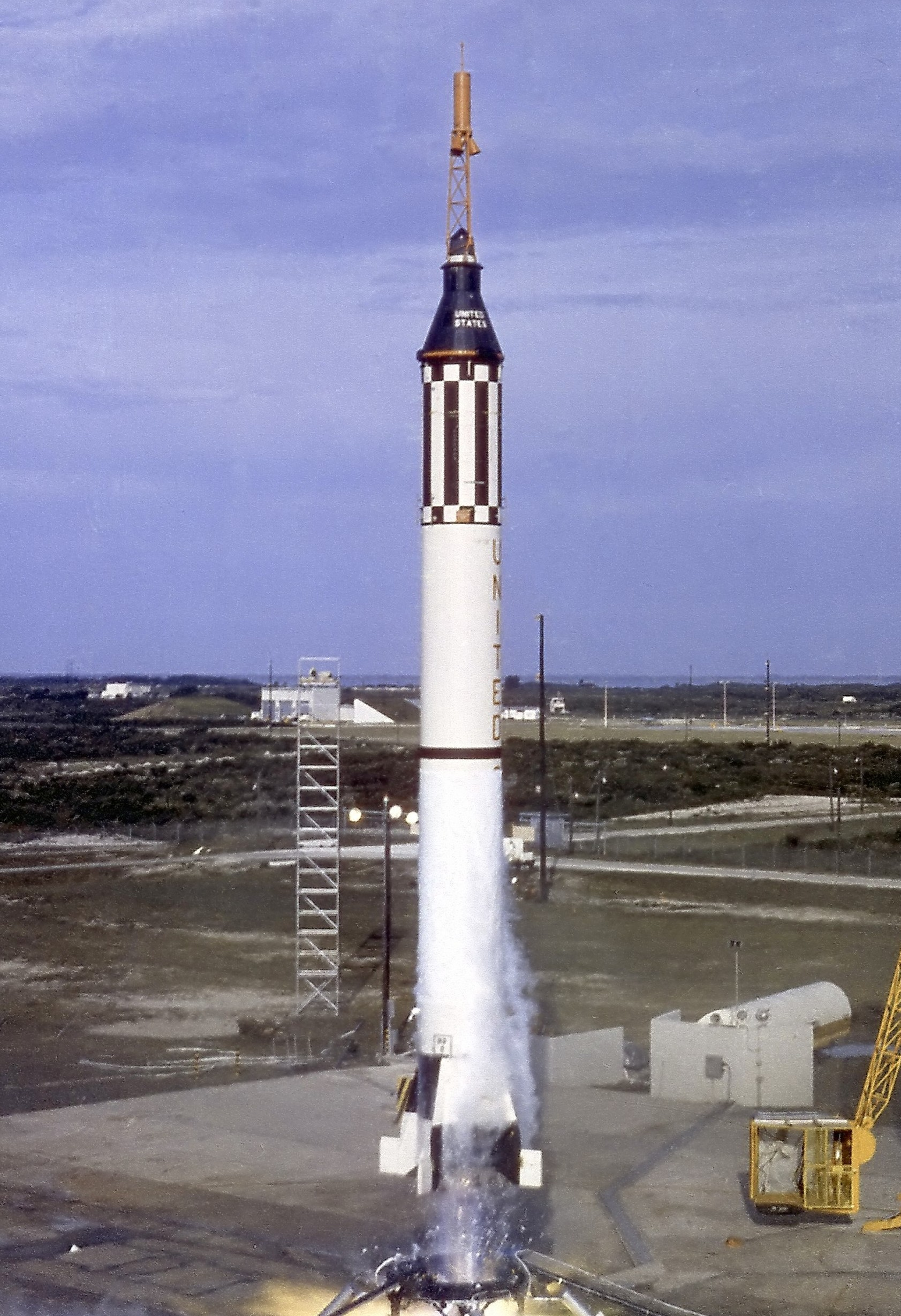
Mercury-Redstone

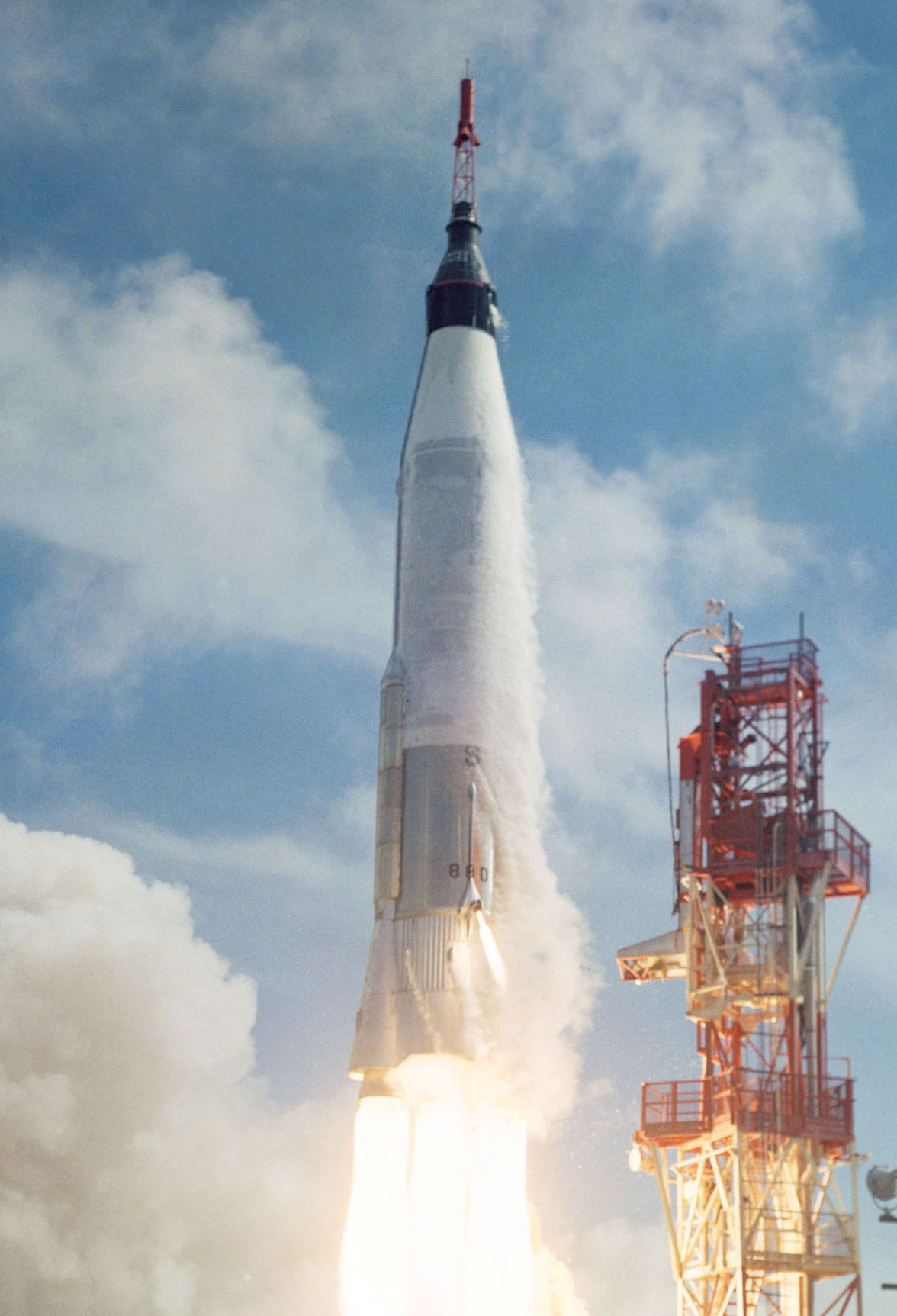
Mercury-Atlas

NASA's first crewed spaceflight program was prepared for launch from Canaveral by U.S. Air Force crews. Mercury's objectives were to place a crewed spacecraft into Earth's orbit, investigate human performance and ability to function in space, and safely recover the astronaut and spacecraft. Suborbital flights were launched by derivatives of the Army's Redstone missile from LC-5; two such flights were manned by Alan Shepard on May 5, 1961, and Gus Grissom on July 21. Orbital flights were launched by derivatives of the Air Force's larger Atlas D missile from LC-14. The first American in orbit was John Glenn on February 20, 1962. Three more orbital flights followed through May 1963.

Flight control for all Mercury missions was provided at the Mercury Control Center located at Canaveral near LC-14.

Facilities and geographic features of Kennedy Space Center
Facilities and geographical features of Kennedy Space Center:
1 Launch Complex 39 (LC-39A)
2 Launch Complex 39 (LC-39B)
3 Vehicle Assembly Building
4 Shuttle Landing Facility
5 Kennedy Space Center Visitor Complex
6 Apollo/Saturn V Center
7 Banana River
8 Indian River
9 KSC Headquarters Building
10 Astronaut Beach House
11 Banana Creek
12 Cochran Cove
13 Operations and Checkout Building
14 Launch Complex 48
15 SpaceX Roberts Road Operations Center
16 Exploration Park
17 Blue Origin Ransom Road facility
18 Crawlerway
19 Launch Control Center
20 Orbiter Processing Facilities 1 and 2
21 Orbiter Processing Facility 3
22 Launch Complex 39 Press Site
23 Multi-Payload Processing Facility
24 Space Systems Processing Facility
25 NASA Railroad (Wilson Junction)

=== Name changes ===
On November 29, 1963, following the death of President John F. Kennedy, his successor, President Lyndon B. Johnson, issued Executive Order 11129 renaming both NASA's Merritt Island Launch Operations Center and "the facilities of Station No. 1 of the Atlantic Missile Range" (a reference to the Cape Canaveral Missile Test Annex) as the "John F. Kennedy Space Center". He had also convinced then-Florida Governor C. Farris Bryant (D-Florida) to change the name of Cape Canaveral to Cape Kennedy. This resulted in some confusion in public perception, which conflated the two. NASA administrator James E. Webb clarified this by issuing a directive stating the Kennedy Space Center name applied only to Merritt Island, while the Air Force issued a general order renaming the Air Force launch site Cape Kennedy Air Force Station. This name was used through the Project Gemini and early Apollo program.

However, the geographical name change proved to be unpopular, owing to the historical longevity of Cape Canaveral (one of the oldest place-names in the United States, dating to the early 1500s). In 1973 and 1974 respectively, both the geographical and the Air Force Station Cape names were reverted to Canaveral after the Florida legislature passed a bill changing the name back that was signed into law by Florida governor Reubin Askew (D-Fla.).

On August 7, 2020, U.S. military contracts referred to the installation as Cape Canaveral Space Force Station. The installation was formally renamed on December 9, 2020.

=== Gemini and early Apollo ===
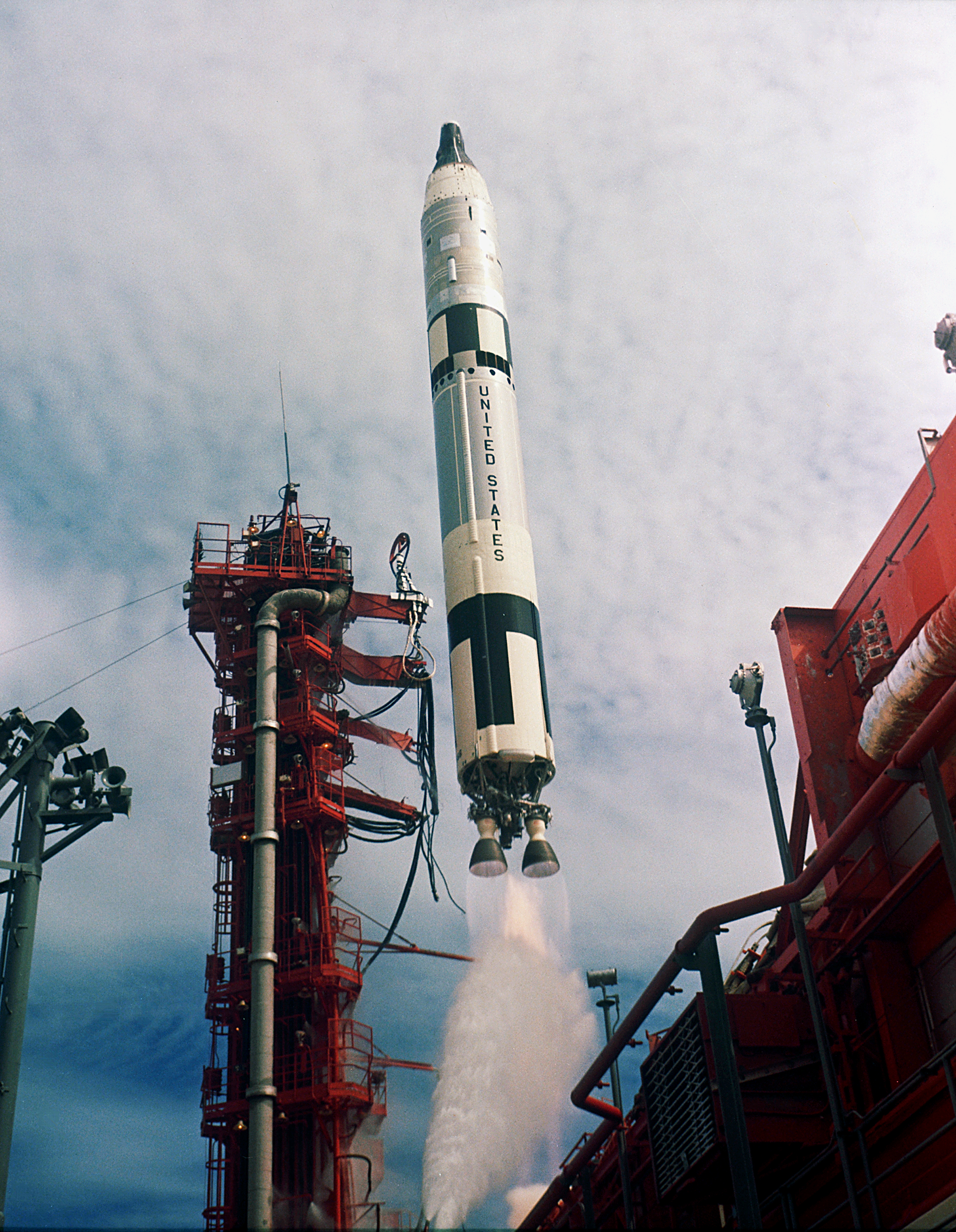
Gemini-Titan II

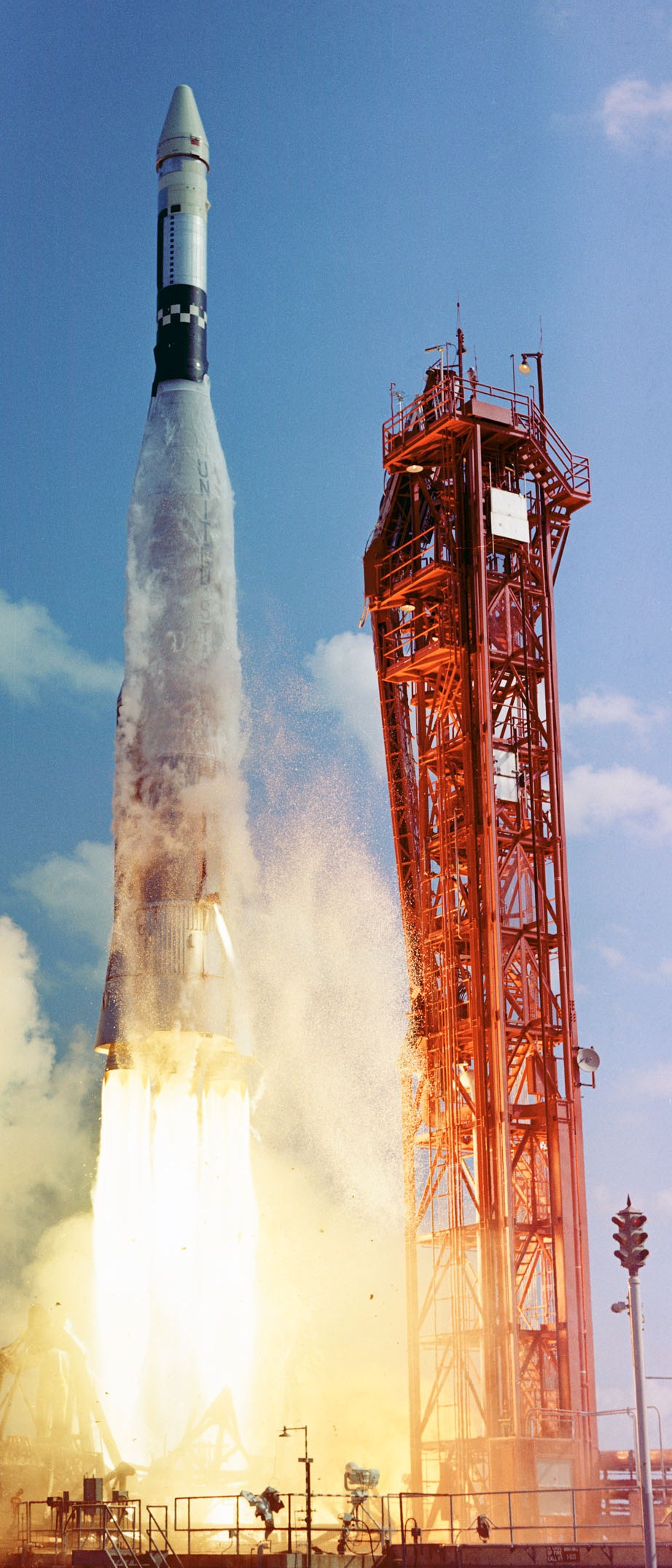
Atlas-Agena target vehicle

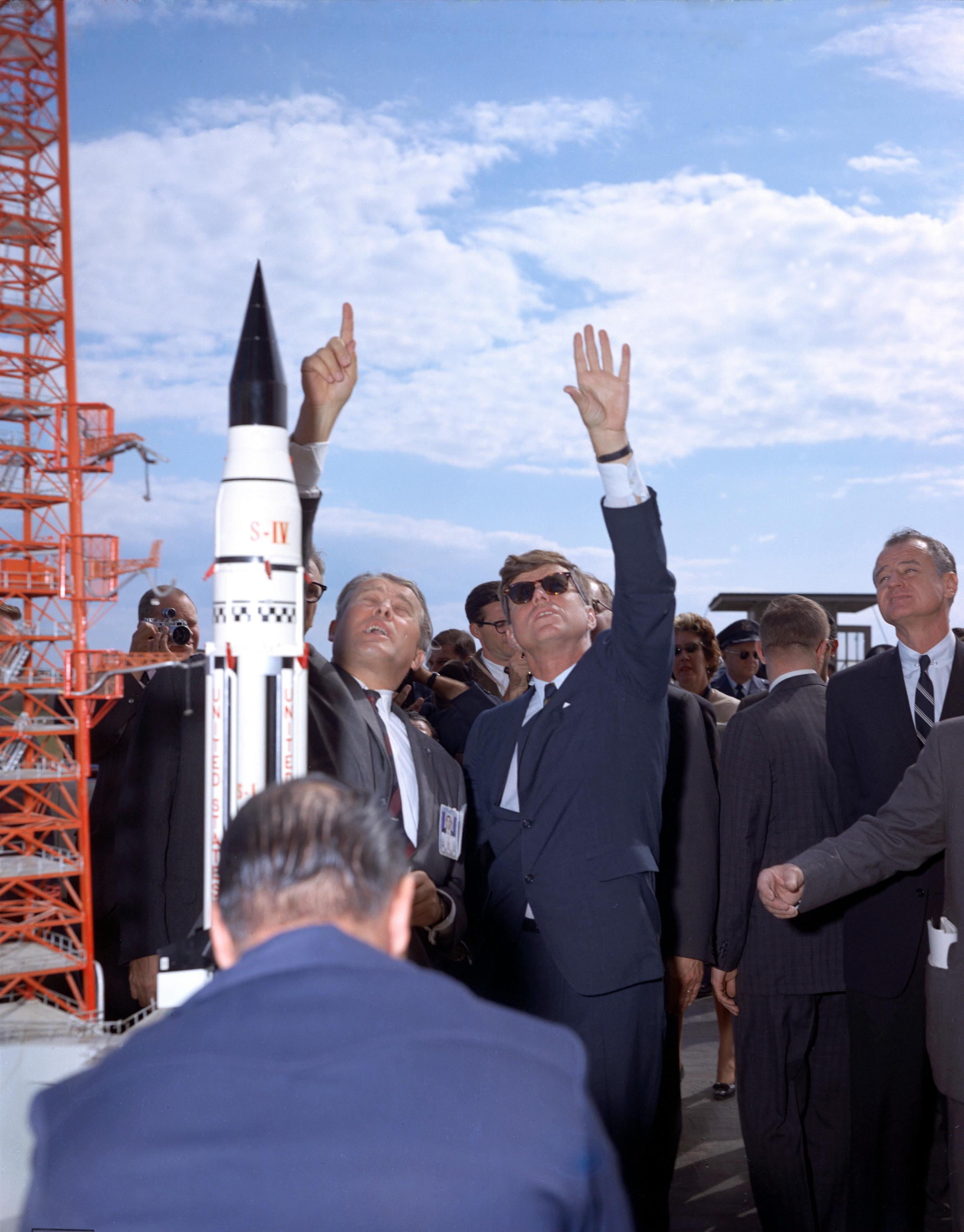
Wernher von Braun explains the Saturn system to President Kennedy during his tour at the Cape Canaveral Missile Test Annex on November 16, 1963.

The two-man Gemini spacecraft was launched into orbit by a derivative of the Air Force Titan II missile. Twelve Gemini flights were launched from LC-19, ten of which were crewed. The first crewed flight, Gemini 3, took place on March 23, 1965. Later Gemini flights were supported by seven uncrewed launches of the Agena target vehicle on the Atlas-Agena from LC-14, to develop rendezvous and docking, critical for Apollo. Two of the Atlas-Agena vehicles failed to reach orbit on Gemini 6 and Gemini 9, and a mis-rigging of the nosecone on a third caused it to fail to eject in orbit, preventing docking on Gemini 9A. The final flight, Gemini 12, launched on November 11, 1966.

The capabilities of the Mercury Control Center were inadequate for the flight control needs of Gemini and Apollo, so NASA built an improved Mission Control Center in 1963, which it decided to locate at the newly built Manned Spacecraft Center in Houston, Texas, rather than at Canaveral or at the Goddard Space Flight Center in Maryland.

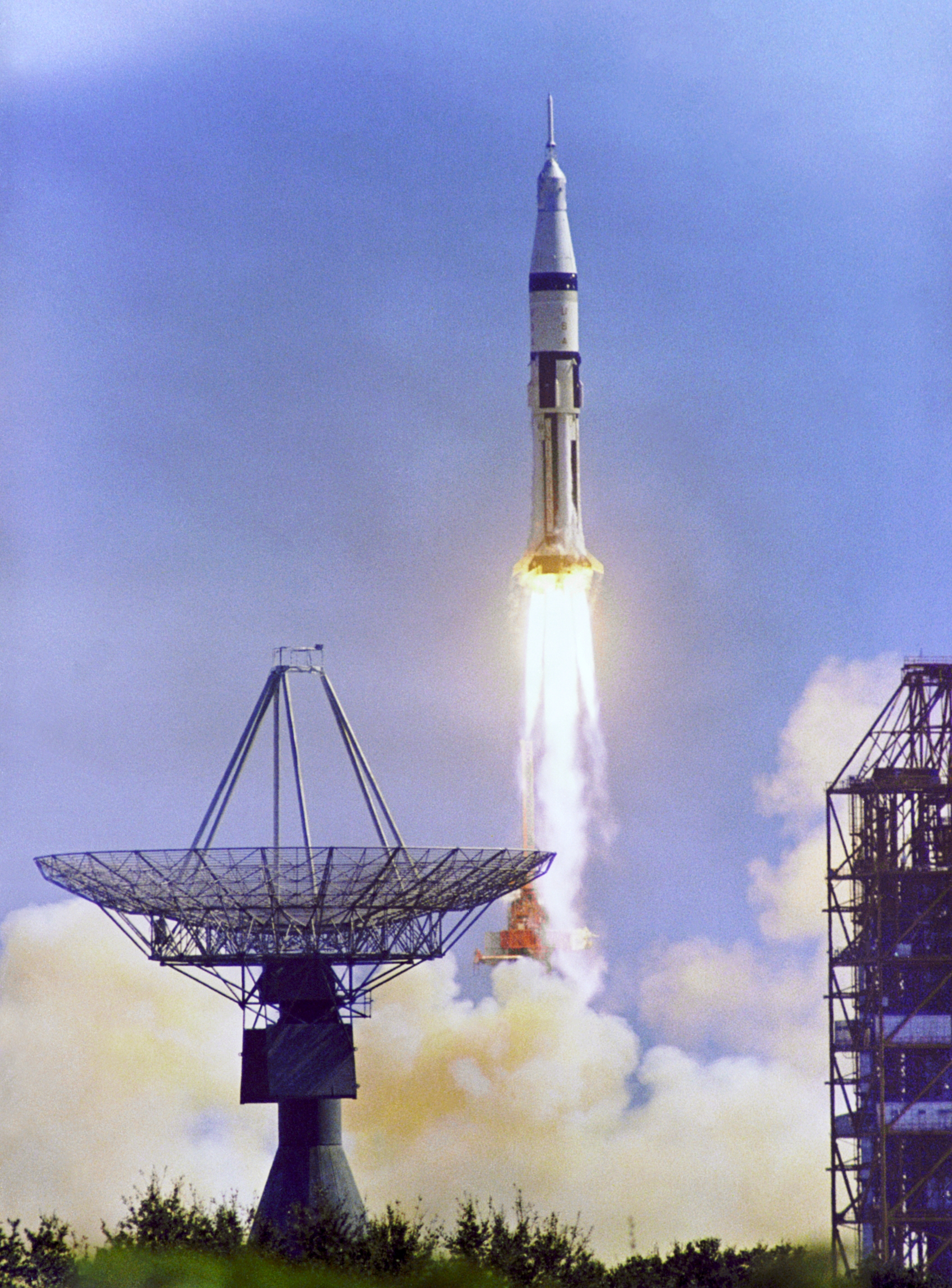
Apollo-Saturn IB

The Apollo program's goal of landing a man on the Moon required development of the Saturn family of rockets. The large Saturn V rocket necessary to take men to the Moon required a larger launch facility than Cape Canaveral could provide, so NASA built the Kennedy Space Center located west and north of Canaveral on Merritt Island. But the earlier Saturn I and IB could be launched from the Cape's Launch Complexes 34 and 37. The first four Saturn I development launches were made from LC-34 between October 27, 1961, and March 28, 1963. These were followed by the final test launch and five operational launches from LC-37 between January 29, 1964, and July 30, 1965.

The Saturn IB uprated the capability of the Saturn I, so that it could be used for Earth orbital tests of the Apollo spacecraft. Two uncrewed test launches of the Apollo command and service module (CSM), AS-201 and AS-202, were made from LC-34, and an uncrewed flight (AS-203) to test the behavior of upper stage liquid hydrogen fuel in orbit from LC-37, between February 26 and August 25, 1966. The first crewed CSM flight, AS-204 or Apollo 1, was planned to launch from LC-34 on February 21, 1967, but the entire crew of Gus Grissom, Ed White and Roger Chaffee were killed in a cabin fire during a spacecraft test on pad 34 on January 27, 1967. The AS-204 rocket was used to launch the uncrewed, Earth orbital first test flight of the Apollo Lunar Module, Apollo 5, from LC-37 on January 22, 1968. After significant safety improvements were made to the Command Module, Apollo 7 was launched from LC-34 to fulfill Apollo 1's mission, using Saturn IB AS-205 on October 11, 1968.

In 1972, NASA deactivated both LC-34 and LC-37. It briefly considered reactivating both for Apollo Applications Program launches after the end of Apollo, but instead modified the Kennedy Space Center launch complex to handle the Saturn IB for the Skylab and Apollo–Soyuz test project launches. The LC-34 service structure and umbilical tower were razed, leaving only the concrete launch pedestal as a monument to the Apollo 1 crew. In 2001, LC-37 was recommissioned and converted to service Delta IV launch vehicles.

=== Subsequent activity ===
The Air Force chose to expand the capabilities of the Titan launch vehicles for its heavy lift capabilities. The Air Force constructed Launch Complexes 40 and 41 to launch Titan III and Titan IV rockets just south of Kennedy Space Center. A Titan III has about the same payload capacity as the Saturn IB at a considerable cost savings.

Launch Complex 40 and 41 have been used to launch defense reconnaissance, communications and weather satellites and NASA planetary missions. The Air Force also planned to launch two Air Force crewed space projects from the Integrate-Transfer-Launch Complex pads of LC-40 and 41. They were the Dyna-Soar, a crewed orbital rocket plane (canceled in 1963) and the USAF Manned Orbital Laboratory (MOL), a crewed reconnaissance space station (canceled in 1969).

From 1974 to 1977 the powerful Titan-Centaur became the new heavy lift vehicle for NASA, launching the Viking and Voyager series of spacecraft from Launch Complex 41. Complex 41 later became the launch site for the most powerful uncrewed U.S. rocket, the Titan IV, developed by the Air Force.

With increased use of a leased launch pad by private company SpaceX, the Air Force launch support operations at the Cape planned for 21 launches in 2014, a fifty percent increase over the 2013 launch rate. SpaceX had reservations for a total of ten of those launches in 2014, with an option for an eleventh.

== Uncrewed launches at Cape Canaveral ==
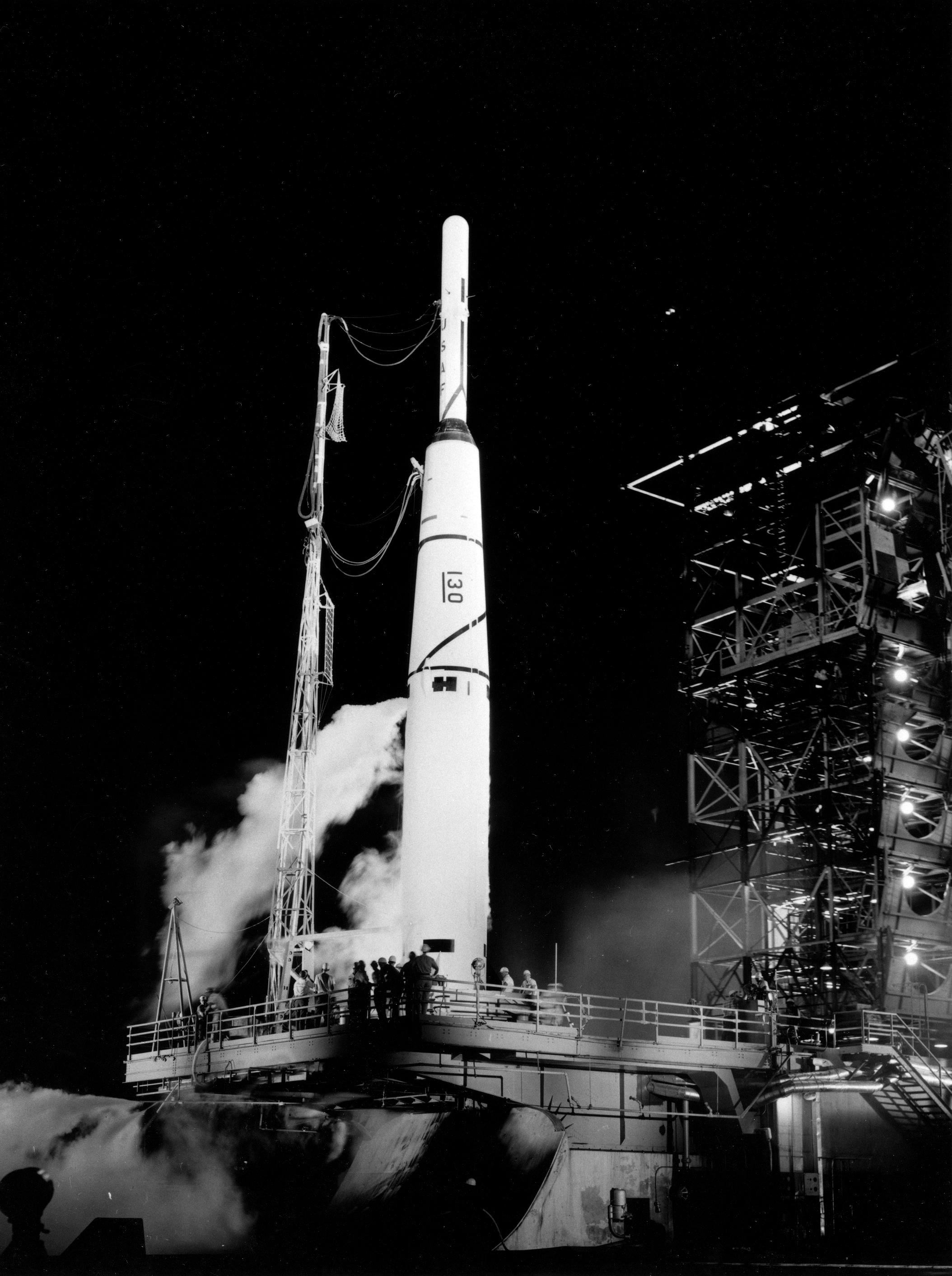
Pioneer 1 atop its launcher

The first United States satellite launch, Explorer 1, was made by the Army Ballistic Missile Agency on February 1, 1958 (UTC) from Canaveral's LC-26A using a Juno I RS-29 missile. NASA's first launch, Pioneer 1, came on October 11 of the same year from LC-17A using a Thor-Able rocket.

Besides Project Gemini, the Atlas-Agena launch complexes LC-12 and LC-13 were used during the 1960s for the uncrewed Ranger and Lunar Orbiter programs and the first five Mariner interplanetary probes. The Atlas-Centaur launch complex LC-36 was used for the 1960s Surveyor uncrewed lunar landing program and the last five Mariner probes through 1973.

NASA has also launched communications and weather satellites from the ITL at Launch Complexes 40 and 41, built at the north end of the Cape in 1964 by the Air Force for its Titan IIIC and Titan IV rockets. From 1974 to 1977 the powerful Titan IIIE served as the heavy-lift vehicle for NASA, launching the Viking and Voyager series of planetary spacecraft from LC-41 and the Cassini–Huygens Saturn probe from LC-40.

Three Cape Canaveral pads are currently operated by private industry for military and civilian launches: SLC-41 for United Launch Alliance's Atlas V and Vulcan Centaur; LC-36 for Blue Origin's New Glenn and SLC-40 for the SpaceX Falcon 9.

=== Boeing X-37B ===
The Boeing X-37B, a reusable uncrewed spacecraft operated by USSF, which is also known as the Orbital Test Vehicle (OTV), has been successfully launched four times from Cape Canaveral. The first four X-37B missions have been launched with Atlas V rockets. Past launch dates for the X-37B spaceplane include April 22, 2010, March 5, 2011, December 11, 2012, and May 20, 2015. The fourth X-37B mission landed at the Kennedy Space Center on May 7, 2017, after 718 days in orbit. The first three X-37B missions all made successful autonomous landings from space to a 15,000 foot (4,600 m) runway located at Vandenberg Space Force Base in California which was originally designed for Space Shuttle return from orbit operations.

== Operations, infrastructure and facilities ==
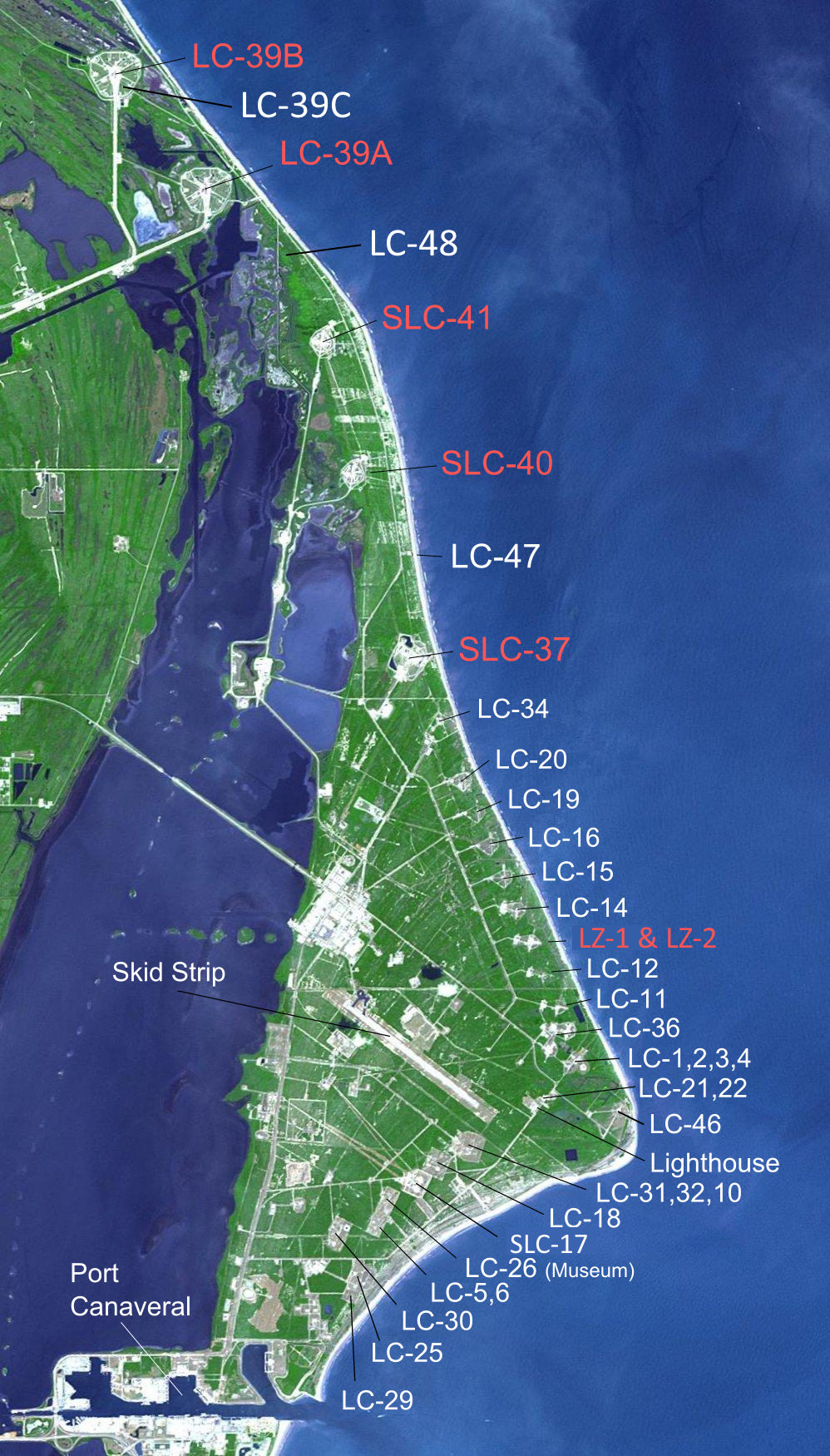
Cape Canaveral Space Force Station; click on a label to read more about it.

Of the launch complexes built since 1950, several have been leased and modified for use by private aerospace companies. Launch Complex SLC-17 was used for the Delta II Heavy variant, through 2011. Launch Complexes SLC-37 and SLC-41 were modified to launch EELV Delta IV and Atlas V launch vehicles, respectively. These launch vehicles replaced all earlier Delta, Atlas, and Titan rockets. Launch Complex SLC-47 is used to launch weather sounding rockets. Launch Complex SLC-46 is reserved for use by Space Florida.

SLC-40 hosted the first launch of the SpaceX Falcon 9 in June 2010. Falcon 9 launches continued from this complex through 2015, consisting of uncrewed Commercial Resupply Services missions for NASA to the International Space Station as well as commercial satellite flights. On September 30, 2024, SpaceX launched the first crewed flight from SLC-40. SpaceX has also leased Launch Complex 39A from NASA and has completed modifying it to accommodate Falcon Heavy and Commercial Crew crewed spaceflights to the ISS with their Crew Dragon spacecraft in 2019. SpaceX Landing Zone 1 and 2, used to land first stages of the Falcon 9 and the side boosters of the Falcon Heavy, are located at the site of the former LC-13.

On September 16, 2015, NASA announced that Blue Origin has leased Launch Complex 36 and will modify it as a launch site for their next-generation launch vehicles.

In the case of low-inclination (geostationary) launches the location of the area at 28°27'N put it at a slight disadvantage against other launch facilities situated nearer the equator. The boost eastward from the Earth's rotation is about 406 m/s (908 miles per hour) at Cape Canaveral, but 463 m/s (1,035 miles per hour) at the European Guiana Space Centre in French Guiana.

In the case of high-inclination (polar) launches, the latitude does not matter, but the Cape Canaveral area is not suitable, because inhabited areas underlie these trajectories; Vandenberg Space Force Base, Cape Canaveral's West Coast counterpart, or the smaller Pacific Spaceport Complex – Alaska (PSCA) are used instead.

The Cape Canaveral Space Force Museum is located at LC-26. Hangar AE, located in the CCAFS Industrial Area, collects telemetry from launches all over the United States. NASA's Launch Services Program has three Launch Vehicle Data Centers (LVDC) within that display telemetry real-time for engineers.

=== Cape Canaveral Space Force Station Skid Strip ===
Cape Canaveral Space Force Station Skid Strip (ICAO: KXMR, FAA LID: XMR) is a military airport at Cape Canaveral Space Force Station (CCSFS), 7 nautical miles (13 km; 8.1 mi) northeast of Cocoa Beach, Florida. It has an asphalt-paved runway designated 13/31 and measuring 10,000 by 200 ft (3,048 by 61 m). The facility is owned by the United States Space Force (USSF).

This airport is assigned a three-letter location identifier of XMR by the Federal Aviation Administration, but it does not have an IATA airport code.

The runway was first called the Skid Strip because SM-62 Snark cruise missiles (which lacked wheels) returning from test flights were supposed to skid to a halt on it.

In the 1960s the Douglas C-133 Cargomaster was a frequent visitor, carrying modified Atlas and Titan missiles, used as launch vehicles for crewed and uncrewed space programs leading to the Apollo Moon landings. The Skid Strip was used by NASA's Pregnant Guppy and Super Guppy transport aircraft carrying the S-IVB upper stage for the Saturn IB and Saturn V rockets used in Apollo program.

Today, it is predominantly used by USAF C-130 Hercules, C-17 Globemaster III and C-5 Galaxy aircraft transporting satellite payloads to CCSFS for mating with launch vehicles.

The CCSFS Skid Strip is sometimes confused with the NASA Shuttle Landing Facility, but that runway, specially constructed for the Space Shuttle, is located on Merritt Island at the adjacent Kennedy Space Center.

=== Naval Ordnance Test Unit ===
A tenant command located at Cape Canaveral SFS is the U.S. Navy's Naval Ordnance Test Unit (NOTU). As a major shore command led by a Navy captain, NOTU was created in 1950 and initially directed almost all of its efforts towards the development and subsequent support of the submarine-launched Fleet Ballistic Missile (FBM) program. This resulted in NOTU being assigned to the director of Special Projects (now Strategic Systems Programs) with a mission to support the development of the Polaris missile and later the Poseidon missile programs.

NOTU's mission is the support and testing of sea-based weapons systems for the United States Navy and the Royal Navy in a safe environment utilizing the airspace and waterspace of the Eastern Range. The command directly supports the mission capability and readiness of the United States Navy's Trident Submarines as well as the Fleet Ballistic Missile program of the United Kingdom. NOTU operates the Navy Port at Port Canaveral, supporting submarines and surface ships of the U.S. Atlantic Fleet, NATO, Allied and other foreign navies, and assets of the Military Sealift Command. NOTU is composed of over 100 active duty U.S. Navy personnel and over 70 defense contractors.

=== Notable Launch Complexes ===
Listed below in this article are less notable launch complexes at the Cape. For a complete list of all launch complexes, see the below table.

Launch sites at Cape Canaveral Space Force Station and Kennedy Space Center
Active pads
Inactive leased pads
Inactive unleased pads
Repurposed pads, not used for launches
1 LC-39B
2 LC-39A
3 LC-48
4 SLC-41
5 SLC-40
6 LC-47
7 SLC-37
8 LC-34
9 SLC-20
10 LC-19
11 LC-16
12 LC-15
13 LC-14
14 LC-13 (LZ-2)
15 LC-12
16 LC-11
17 LC-36
18 LC-1, LC-2, LC-3, and LC-4
19 SLC-46
20 LC-21 and LC-22
21 LC-31 and LC-32
22 LC-18
23 SLC-17
24 LC-26
25 LC-5 and LC-6
26 LC-30
27 LC-25
28 LC-29

=== LC-1 ===
Launch Complex 1 (LC-1) is located on the eastern tip of Cape Canaveral. It was constructed in the early 1950s for the Snark missile program.

The first launch from this site was conducted on January 13, 1955. The complex was used for Snark missions until 1960, and then was utilized as a helicopter pad during Project Mercury. The final use of the site was from 1983 to 1989 for tethered aerostat balloon radar missions. It is now deactivated.

=== LC-2 ===
Launch Complex 2 (LC-2) is a deactivated launch site on the eastern tip of Cape Canaveral. It was constructed with launch complexes 1, 3, and 4, in the early 1950s, for the Snark missile program.

The first launch from this site was a Snark test conducted on February 18, 1954. The complex was used for Snark missions until 1960, and then was utilized as a helicopter pad during Project Mercury. The final use of the site was during the 1980s for tethered aerostat balloon radar missions.

=== LC-3 ===
Launch Complex 3 (LC-3) is a deactivated launch site southeast of SLC-36 at Cape Canaveral. It was constructed, with launch complexes 1, 2, and 4, in the early 1950s for the Snark missile program.

It was formerly used to launch Bumper, BOMARC, UGM-27 Polaris, and Lockheed X-17 missiles. The pad was also the site of the first launch from Cape Canaveral, a Bumper rocket on July 24, 1950. The site also served as a medical support facility during Project Mercury.

In 2023, after weeks of searching, students from the University of Central Florida, working with archaeologists, discovered the site of the original blockhouse supporting the first Bumper launch just north of the pad at LC-3, including the slab foundation and some of the surrounding Marston Mat, all long-buried under heavy scrub.

=== LC-4 ===
LC-4 Launches
Date/Time (UTC)	Type	Mission	Notes
10 September 1952	Bomarc	Bomarc 621–1	Failed
20 August 1953, 14:37	Redstone	Redstone RS-1	Failed
27 January 1954, 15:20	Redstone	Redstone RS-2	
5 May 1954, 17:28	Redstone	Redstone RS-3	Failed
18 August 1954, 14:04	Redstone	Redstone RS-4	Failed
17 November 1954, 18:12	Redstone	Redstone RS-6	Failed
9 February 1955, 20:15	Redstone	Redstone RS-8	Failed
6 May 1955	Matador	Matador GM-52-1895	
2 February 1956	Bomarc	Bomarc 623–13	
21 May 1956	Bomarc	Bomarc 623–16	Failed
17 April 1957	Bomarc	Bomarc 624–1	
22 July 1957	Bomarc	Bomarc 624–7	
1 May 1958	Bomarc	Bomarc 624–19	
7 August 1958	Bomarc	Bomarc 624-XY1	
24 September 1958	Bomarc	Bomarc 624-XY4	
21 October 1958	Bomarc	Bomarc 624-XY6	
21 November 1958	Bomarc	Bomarc 624-XY7	
13 December 1958	Bomarc	Bomarc 624-XY8	
27 January 1959	Bomarc	Bomarc 624-XY16	
21 April 1959	Bomarc	Bomarc 624-XY15	
27 May 1959	Bomarc	Bomarc 631–1	
2 September 1959	Bomarc	Bomarc 631–4	
28 October 1959	Bomarc	Bomarc 631–5	
29 January 1960	Bomarc	Bomarc 631–6	
15 April 1960	Bomarc	Bomarc 631–8	

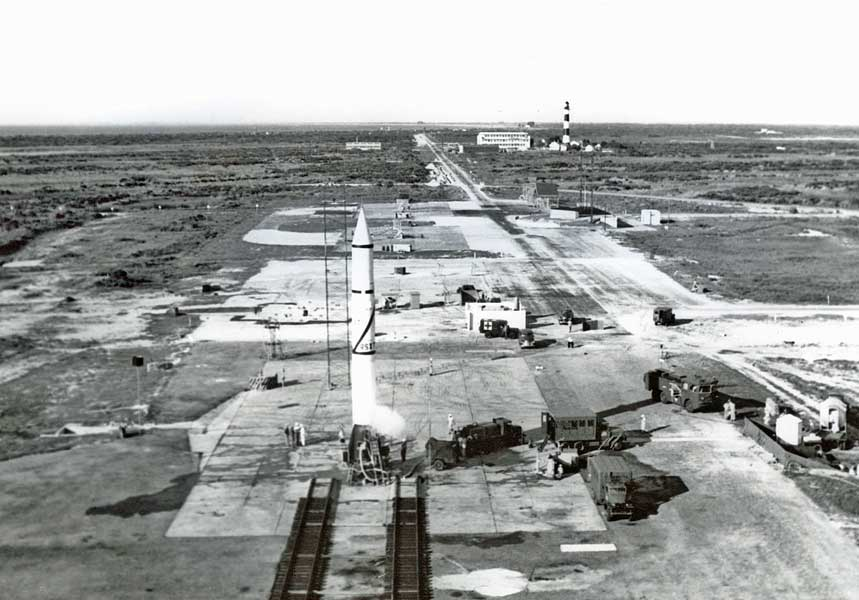
PGM-11 Redstone RS-4 at LC-4

Launch Complex 4 (LC-4) was one of the first launch complexes to be built at Cape Canaveral. It consisted of two pads: LC-4, which was used for 25 launches of Bomarc, Matador and Redstone missiles between 1952 and 1960; and LC-4A, which was used for three Bomarc launches between 1958 and 1959.

Following its deactivation in 1960, the original structures at the complex were dismantled. New facilities were built at the site in the 1980s, and it was used for TARS aerostat operations between 1983 and 1989. Following this, the aerostat launch facilities were also removed, and the complex is currently not accessible to the public.

=== LC-9 ===
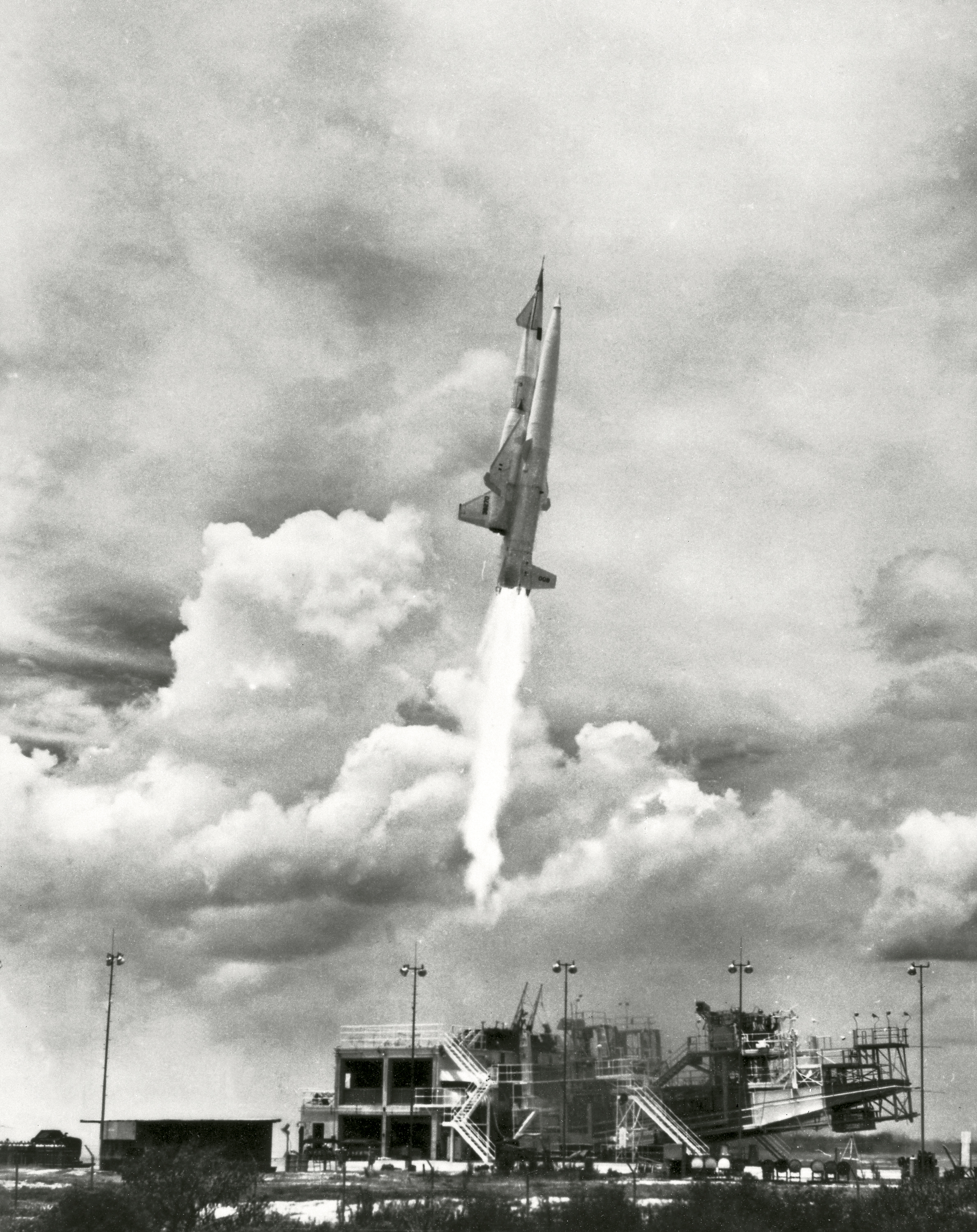
Launch of a Navaho from LC-9

Launch Complex 9 (LC-9) is a small concrete structure consisting of an elevated launch pedestal and flame trench, centered on a small oval-shaped concrete pad. It is north of Launch Complex 17.

It was used for ten test launches of SM-64 Navaho supersonic nuclear-armed cruise missiles. In addition to LC-9, Navaho tests were also conducted at LC-10 and Edwards Air Force Base. The Navaho was canceled after poor performance in testing: eight of the eleven test launches of the final prototype failed. All of the failed launches were conducted from LC-9.

As of 2023, the concrete launch structure is still standing, but is not maintained; and the launch support equipment has been removed. The site is not accessible to the general public.

=== LC-10 ===
Launch Complex 10 (LC-10) was used for one SM-64 Navaho missile launch, and later Jason sounding rockets and the Alpha Draco research missile. It was located north of Launch Complex 17, where Launch Complexes 31 and 32 are now located.

A single Navaho missile was test-launched from LC-10, on August 12, 1957, and was one of only three Navahos to complete a successful flight. Following the cancellation of the Navaho, LC-10 was reused for launches of Jason and Draco sounding rockets during 1958 and 1959. The last launch to use the site was of a Draco on April 27, 1959.

LC-10 was subsequently demolished during the construction of Launch Complexes 31 and 32, which were built on the same site.

=== LC-23/24 ===
Launch Complex 23/24 (LC-23/24) was located along the southeast side of Lighthouse Road southwest of Launch Complexes 1 and 2. The designation was first assigned to a testing pad for a sea-based version of the Army’s PGM-19 Jupiter missile. Later, the designation was reused for a SSM-N-2 Triton surface-to-surface winged missile testing site, and planned to contain two launch pads and a blockhouse. Due to its cancellation, only one pad was built, and used for engine run up tests of the SM-62 Snark missile, with no actual launches.

=== LC-25 ===
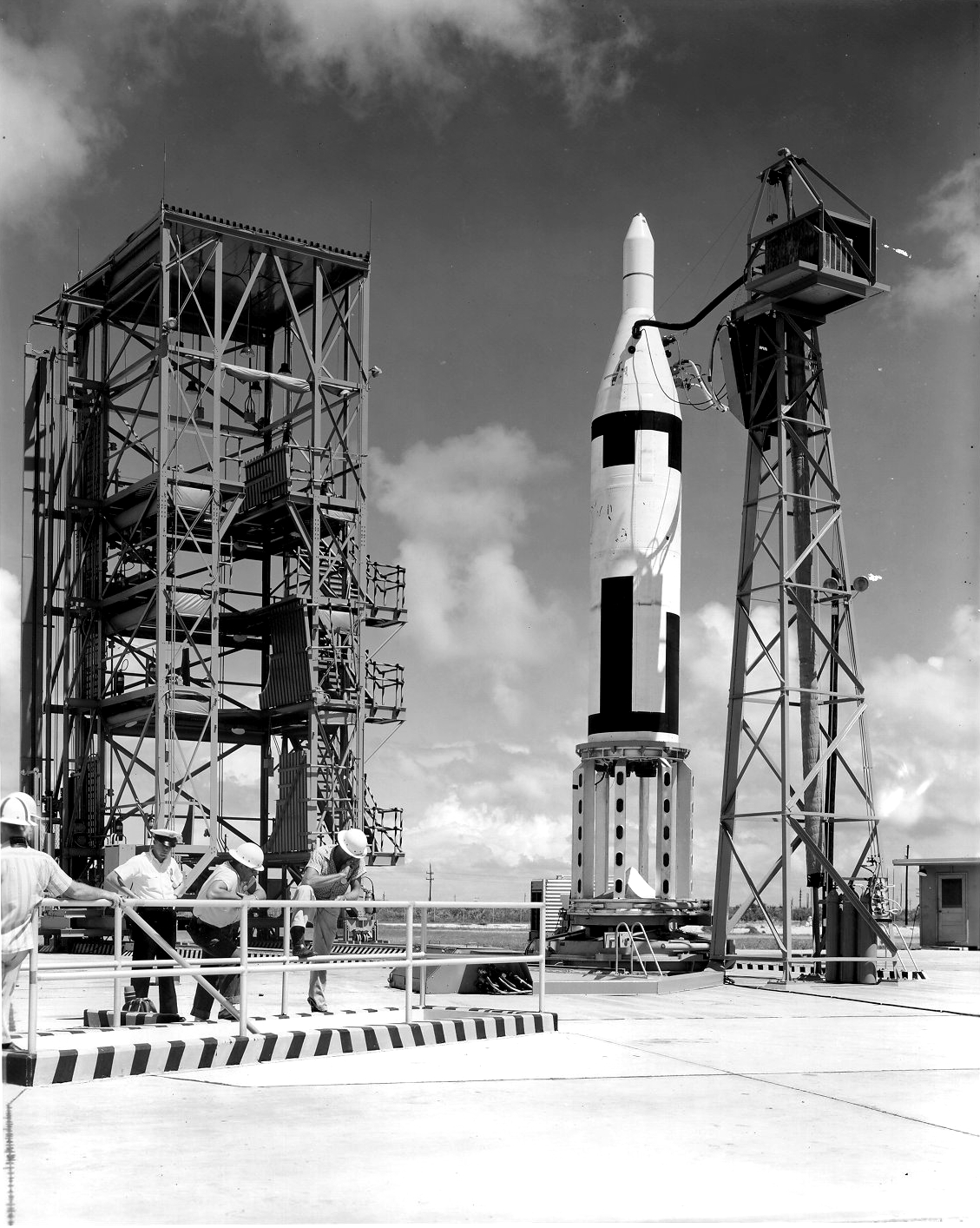
Polaris A1 on Pad LC-25A

Launch Complex 25 (LC-25) was a four-pad site built for test flights of the US Navy's submarine-launched ballistic missiles Polaris, Poseidon and Trident. It was active from 1958 to 1979.

Pads 25A and 25B were built in 1957. Pad 25B was initially built with an underground launch mechanism known as a ship motion simulator to simulate the roll and pitch of a submarine. It was first used August 14, 1959, and was mothballed in October 1961. Pads 25C and 25D were added in May 1968 for the larger Poseidon. One blockhouse served all four pads; it was extensively reinforced when the Poseidon pads were added.

The complex was dismantled in 1979.

In November 2012, ground was broken for a new $185-million Navy missile test facility to be built over the underground structures at LC-25 and LC-29 called the Strategic Weapon System Ashore. The facility will allow the testing of fire control, launch systems and navigation for submarine-fired missiles to be conducted at one facility instead of being done by contractors in different locations around the country.

==== Launch history ====
- Polaris FTV: 19 launches (April 18, 1958 – October 2, 1959)
- Polaris A-1: 16 launches (March 9, 1960 – December 5, 1961)
- Polaris A-2: 14 launches (November 10, 1960 – March 5, 1965)
- Polaris A-3: 11 launches (February 11, 1963 – July 3, 1964)
- Poseidon: 16 launches (August 16, 1968 – June 29, 1970)
- Trident I: 18 launches (January 18, 1977 – January 22, 1979

=== LC-26 ===
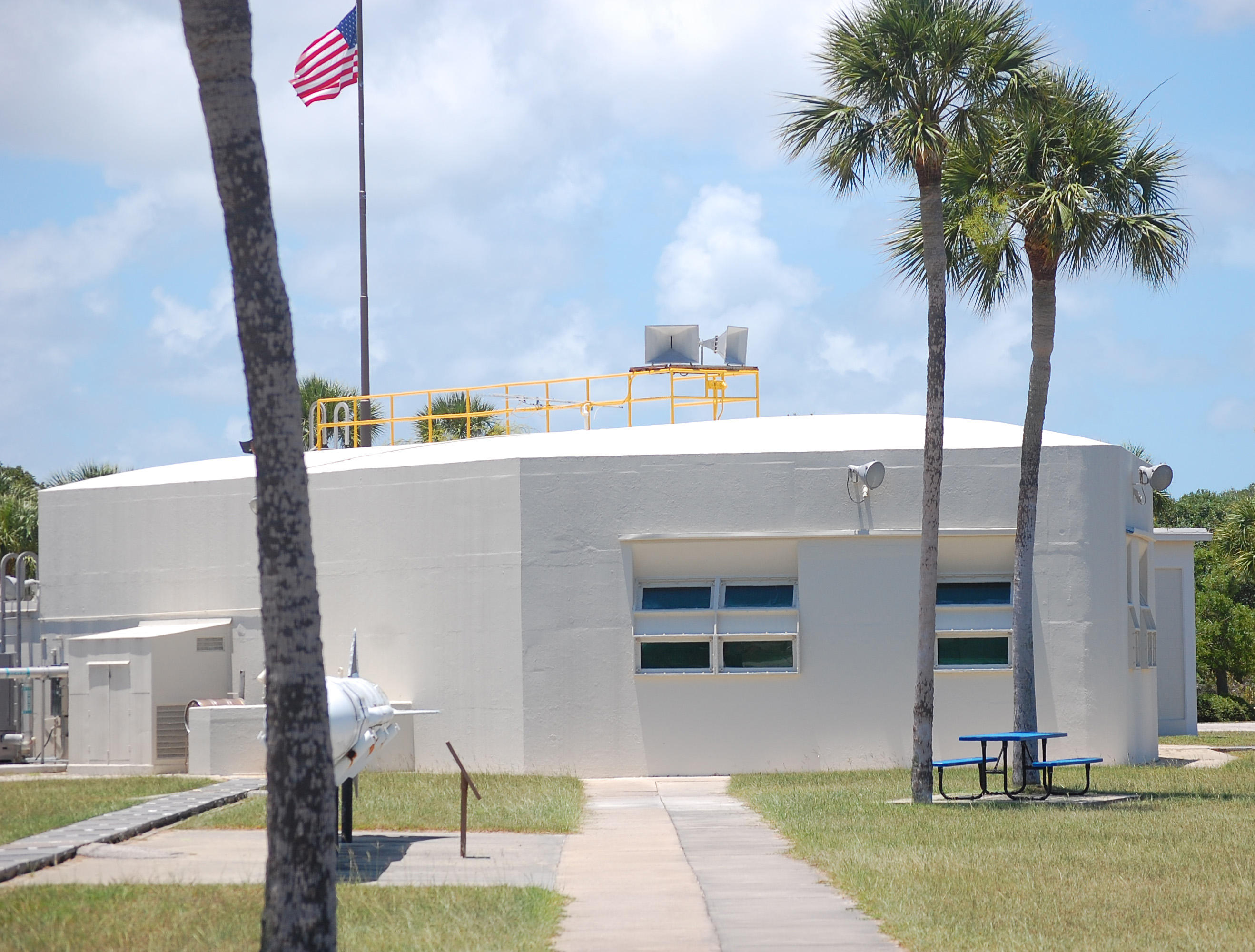
Blockhouse of LC-26 (2010)

Launch Complex 26 (LC-26) consisted of two pads, A and B. Pad A was used for the Jupiter-C and Juno I rockets, and was the launch site for Explorer 1, the United States' first satellite, on February 1, 1958 (January 31 local time). Pad B was used for Juno II. Jupiter IRBMs were launched from both pads.

It was deactivated and is now the home of the Cape Canaveral Space Force Museum.

=== LC-29 ===
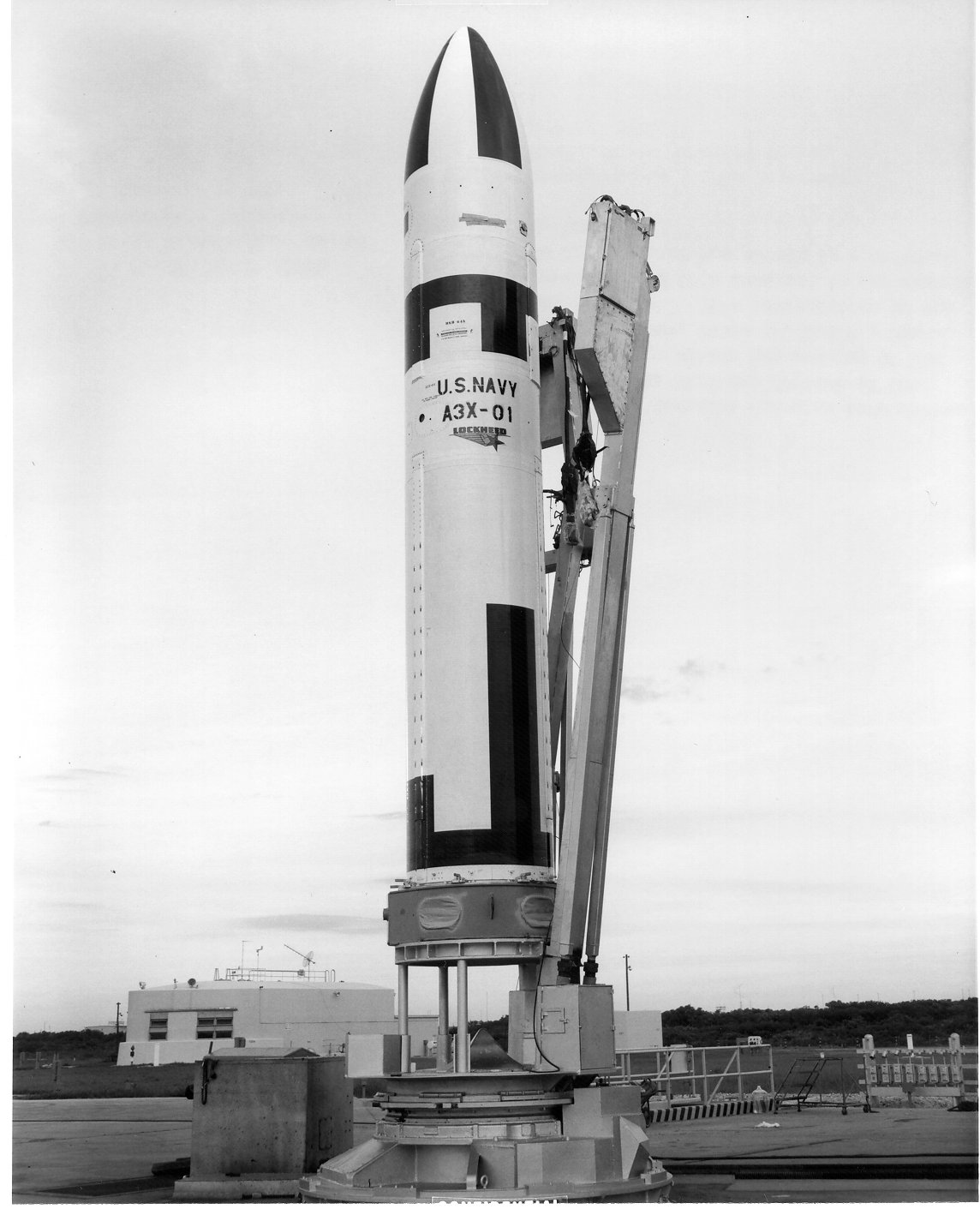
Polaris A-3 on pad LC-29A

Launch Complex 29 (LC-29) was a one-pad launch site at Cape Canaveral built for test flights of the US Navy's submarine-launched Polaris ballistic missiles from 1958 to 1980. It also launched Chevaline missiles, which were British Polaris A-3 missiles.

The complex was designed to contain two launch pads, 29A and 29B, but only 29A was built. The launch complex was dismantled in 1980.

In November 2012, ground was broken for a new $185-million Navy missile test facility to be built over the underground structures at LC-25 and LC-29 called the Strategic Weapons System Ashore. The facility will allow the testing of fire control, launch systems and navigation for submarine-fired missiles to be conducted at one facility instead of being done by contractors in different locations around the country.

==== Launch history ====
- Polaris A1X: 14 launches (September 21, 1959 – April 29, 1960)
- Polaris A-2: 15 launches (January 10, 1961 – November 12, 1965)
- Polaris A-3: 18 launches (August 7, 1962 – November 1, 1967)
- Polaris A-3 Antelope: 3 launches (November 17, 1966 – March 2, 1967)
- British Chevaline launches: (September 11, 1977 – May 19, 1980)

=== LC-43 ===
Launch Complex 43 (LC-43) was used by American sounding rockets between 1962 and 1984, supporting 2,038 launches. These launches to moved to LC-47 in 1984, and LC-43 was demolished to make way for Launch Complex 46, which was built near the site.

=== LC-44 ===
Launch Complex 44 (LC-44) was a flat launch pad used for testing M47 Dragon missiles in 1967, both from handheld launchers and stationary launch stands. On the 29th of August 1968, the deactivated site witnessed a crash of a B-52 bomber following an in-flight emergency. The complex was destroyed during construction of the Trident Turn Basin.

=== Proposed launch complexes ===
Many other numbered launch complexes were proposed but never built, with their numbers being skipped in the sequence. Those included a pair of two-pad complexes between Launch Complex 23/24 and Camera Road Bravo with a single blockhouse for all four pads (LC-7/8), a pair of two-pad launch complexes for SM-64 Navaho (LC-27 along the north side of Lighthouse Road and LC-35 on the right side of South Patrol Road), another pad on the north of the Missile Row near present day Launch Complex 34 (LC-28), a Titan/DynaSoar pad near present day Launch Complex 37 (LC-33), a new Atlas launch complex with an undetailed location (LC-38), and a third Titan III launch pad in the ITL complex (LC-42).

== Based units ==
Units marked GSU are Air Force Geographically Separate Units which, although based at Cape Canaveral SFS, are subordinate to Space Launch Delta 45 headquarters at Patrick SFB.

=== United States Space Force ===
Space Systems Command (SSC)

- Space Launch Delta 45
  - 5th Space Launch Squadron – Atlas V and Delta IV
  - 45th Operations Group (GSU) incorporating the former 45th Launch Group deactivated in 2018
    - 45th Range Squadron
    - 45th Space Communications Squadron
    - 45th Weather Squadron

=== United States Navy ===
- Naval Ordnance Test Unit

== Gallery ==
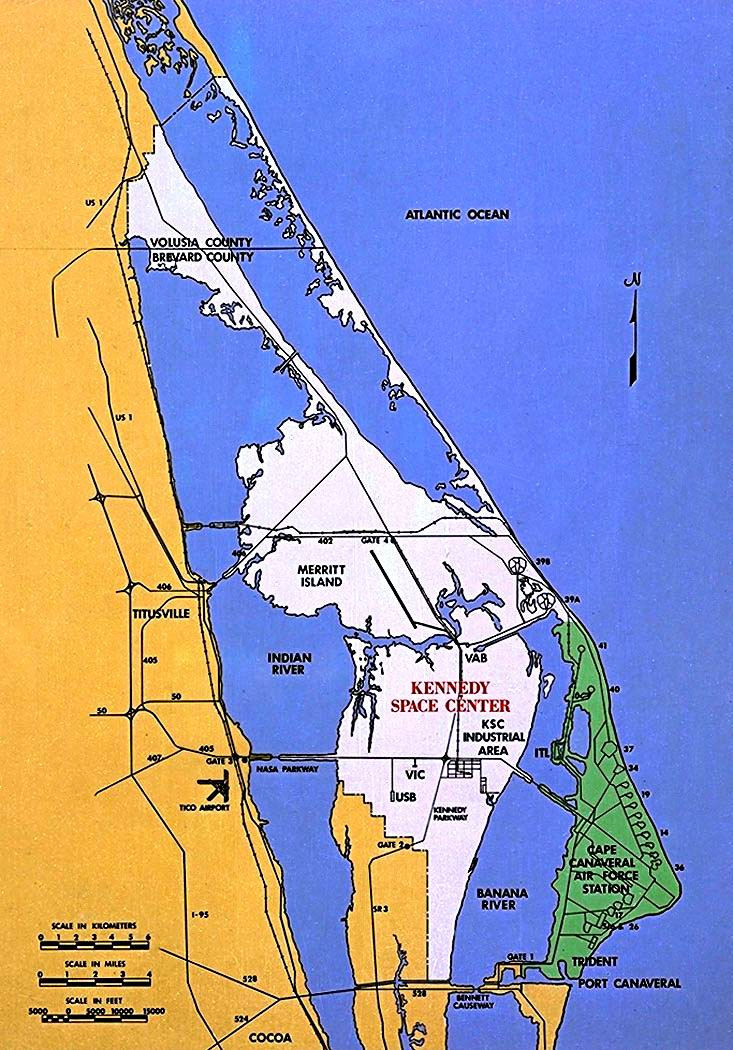
Cape Canaveral Space Force Station (shown in green)

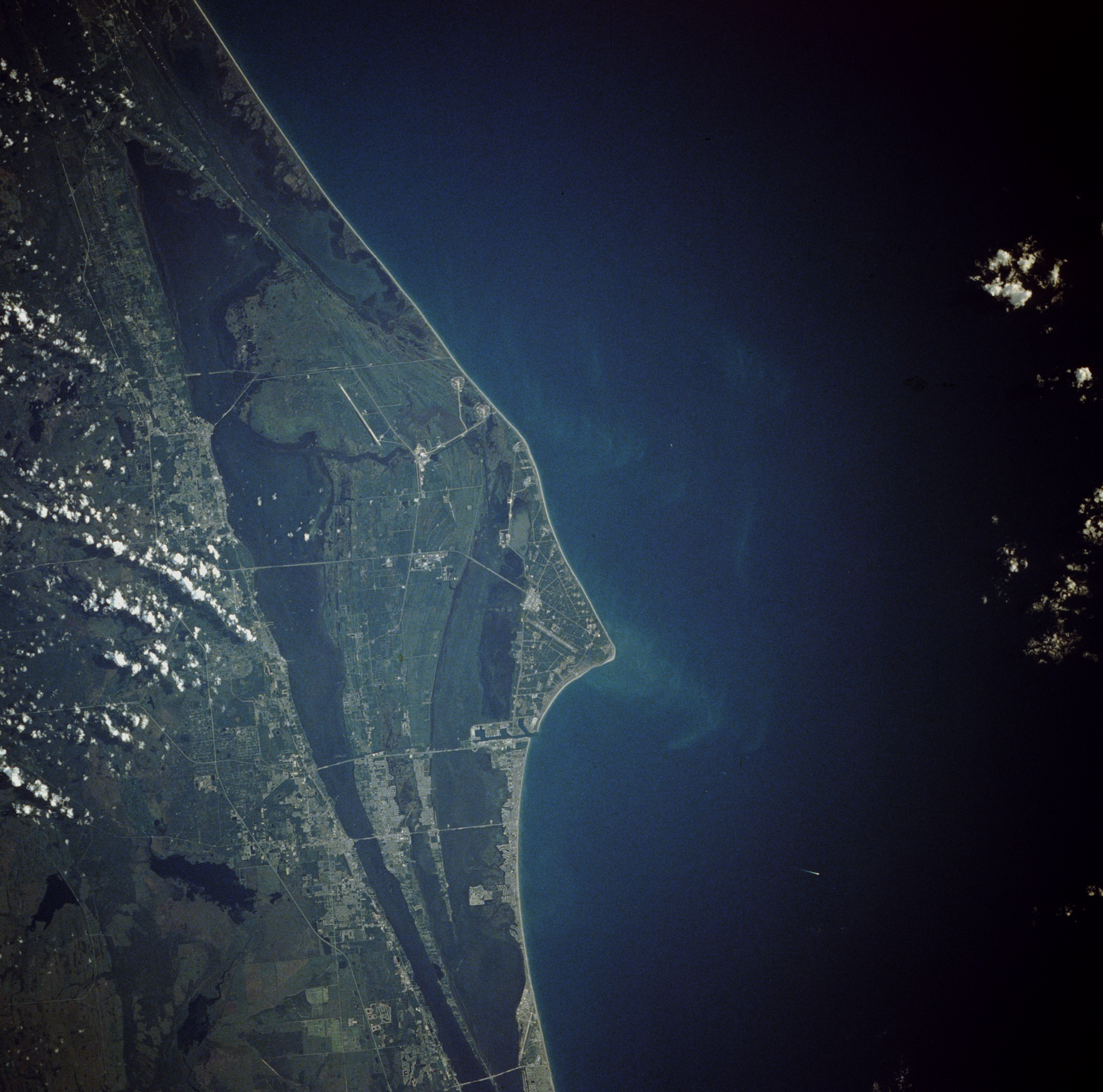
Cape Canaveral as seen from orbit by a Space Shuttle in 1991

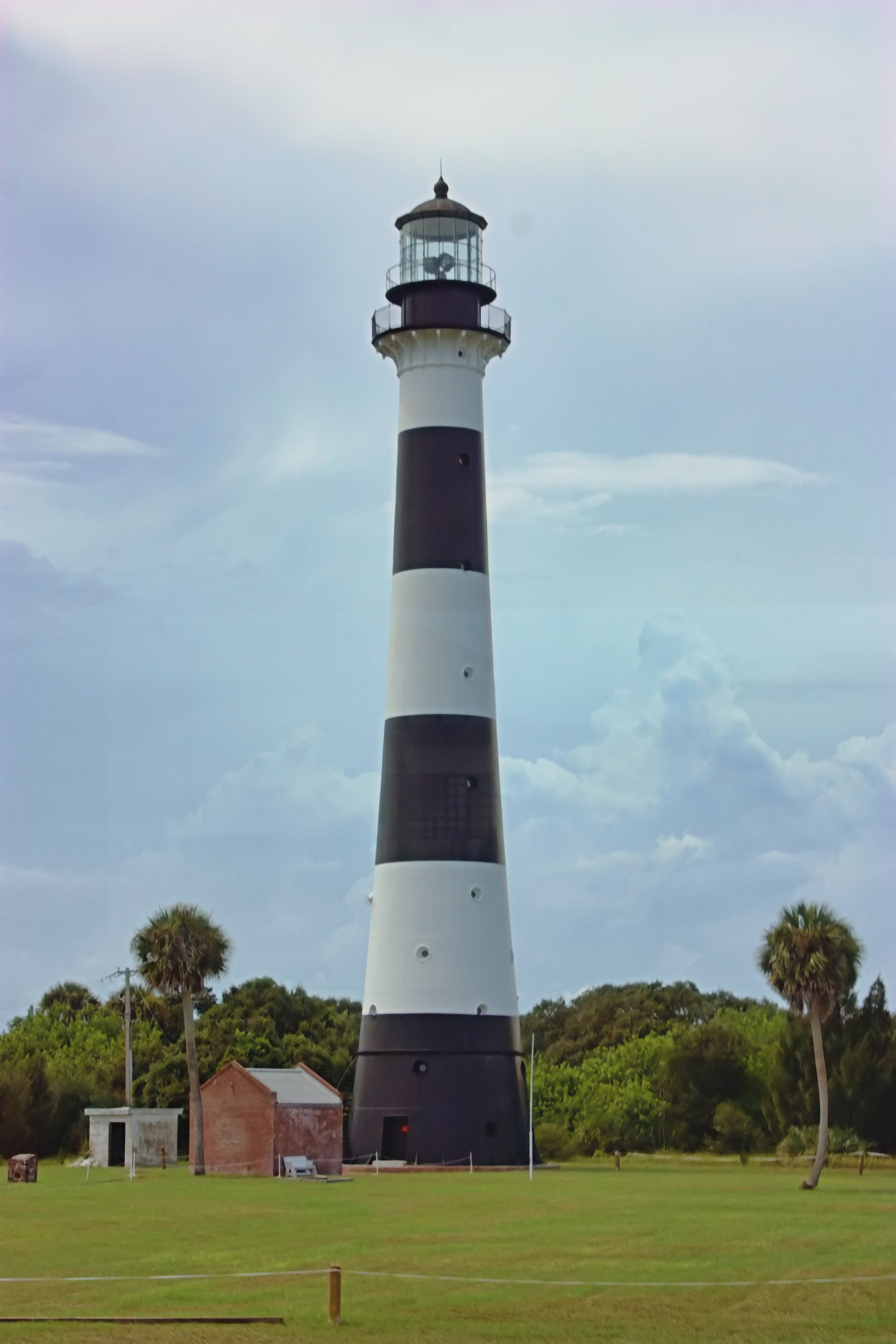
Cape Canaveral lighthouse

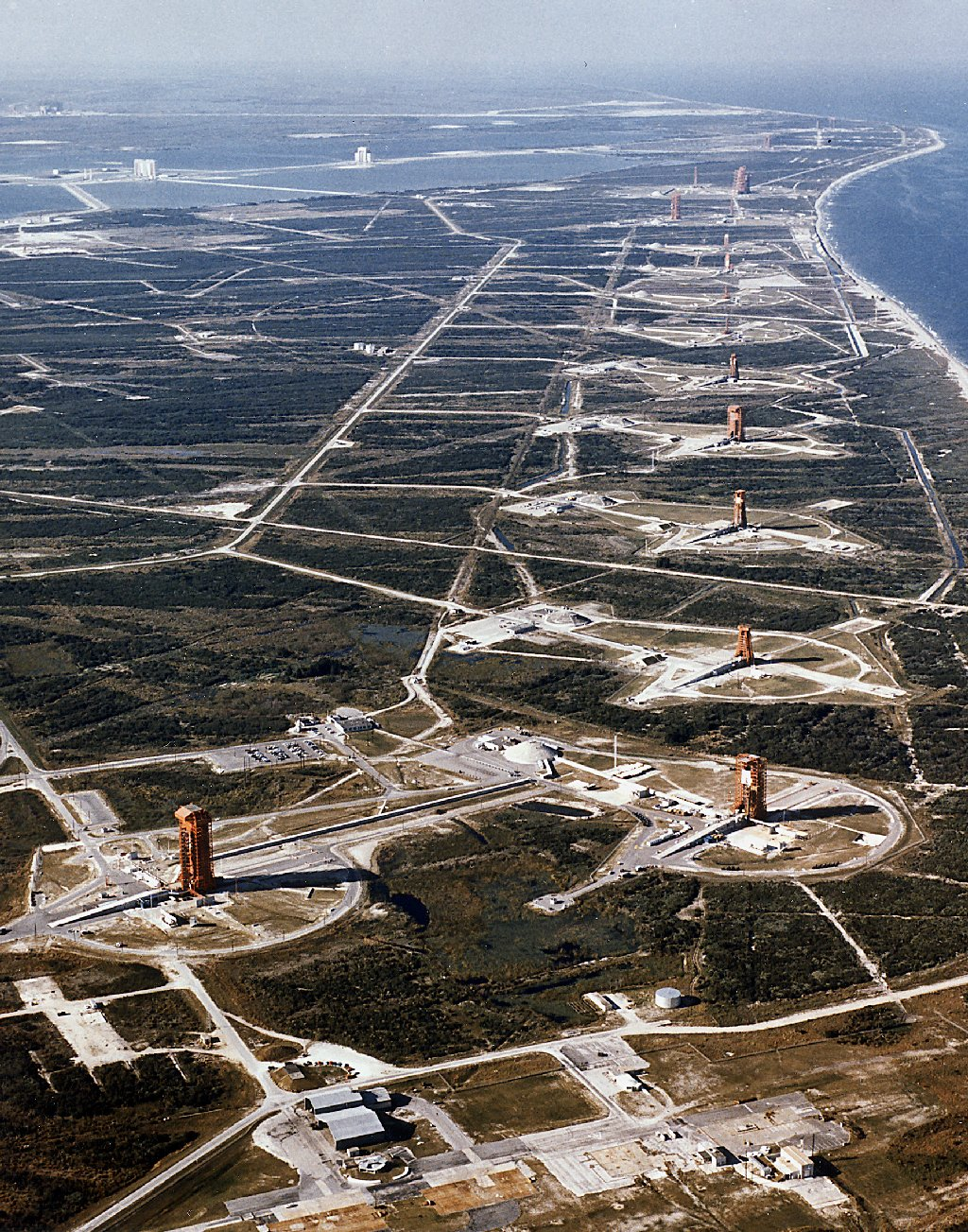
Looking north along Missile Row in the 1960s

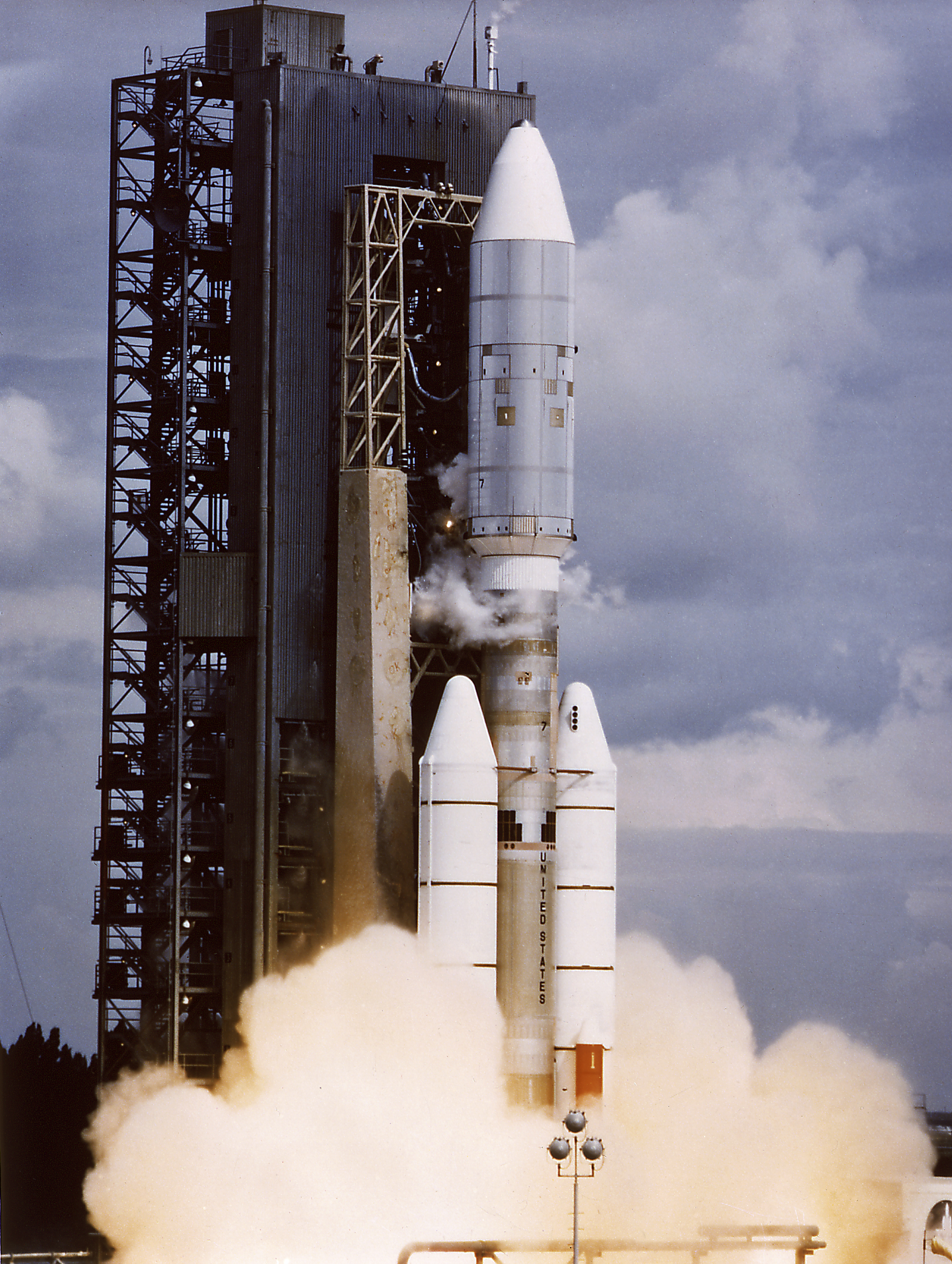
Titan III-E launching Voyager 2 probe in 1977 from SLC-41

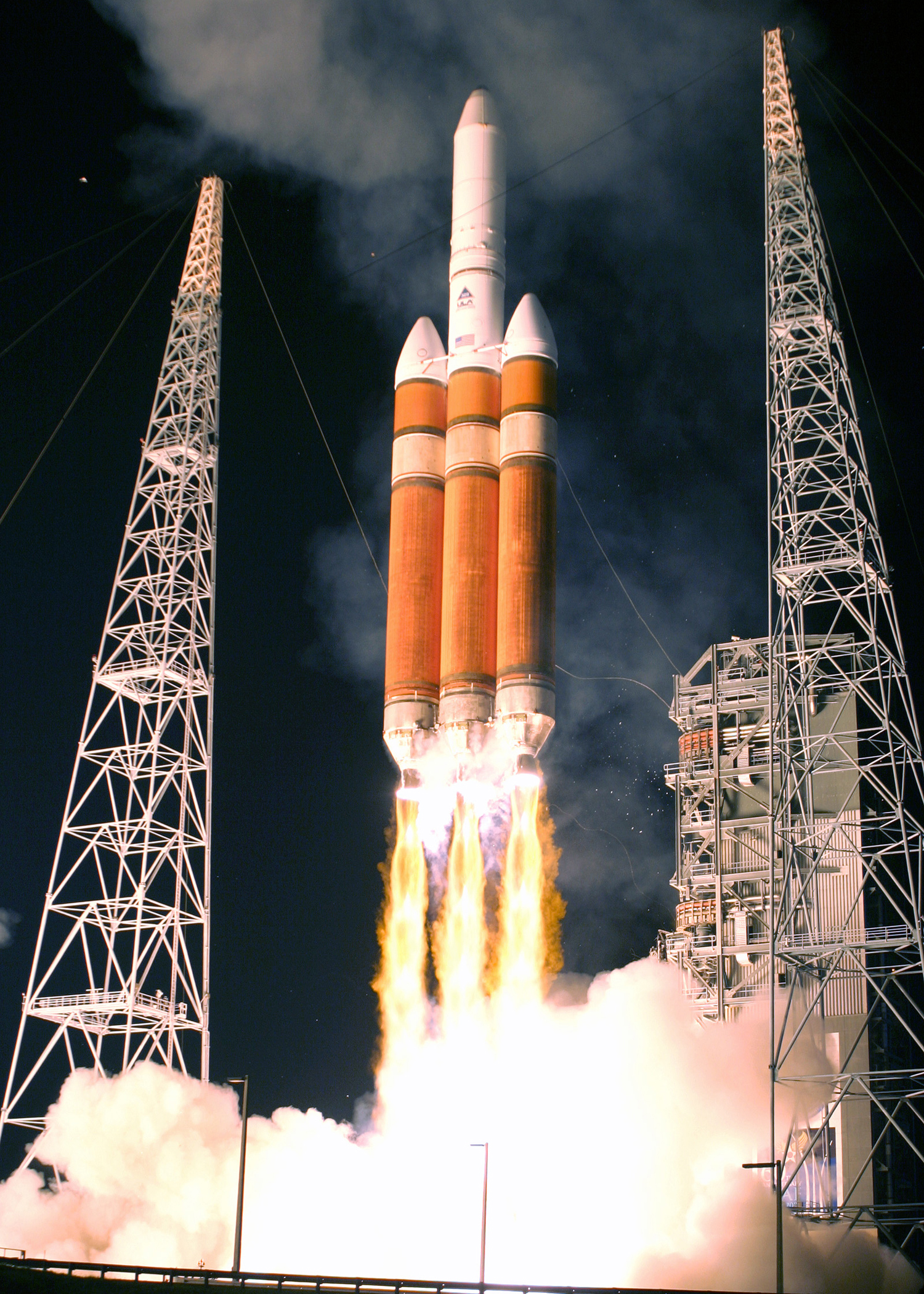
First Delta IV Heavy booster launching from SLC-37 in 2007

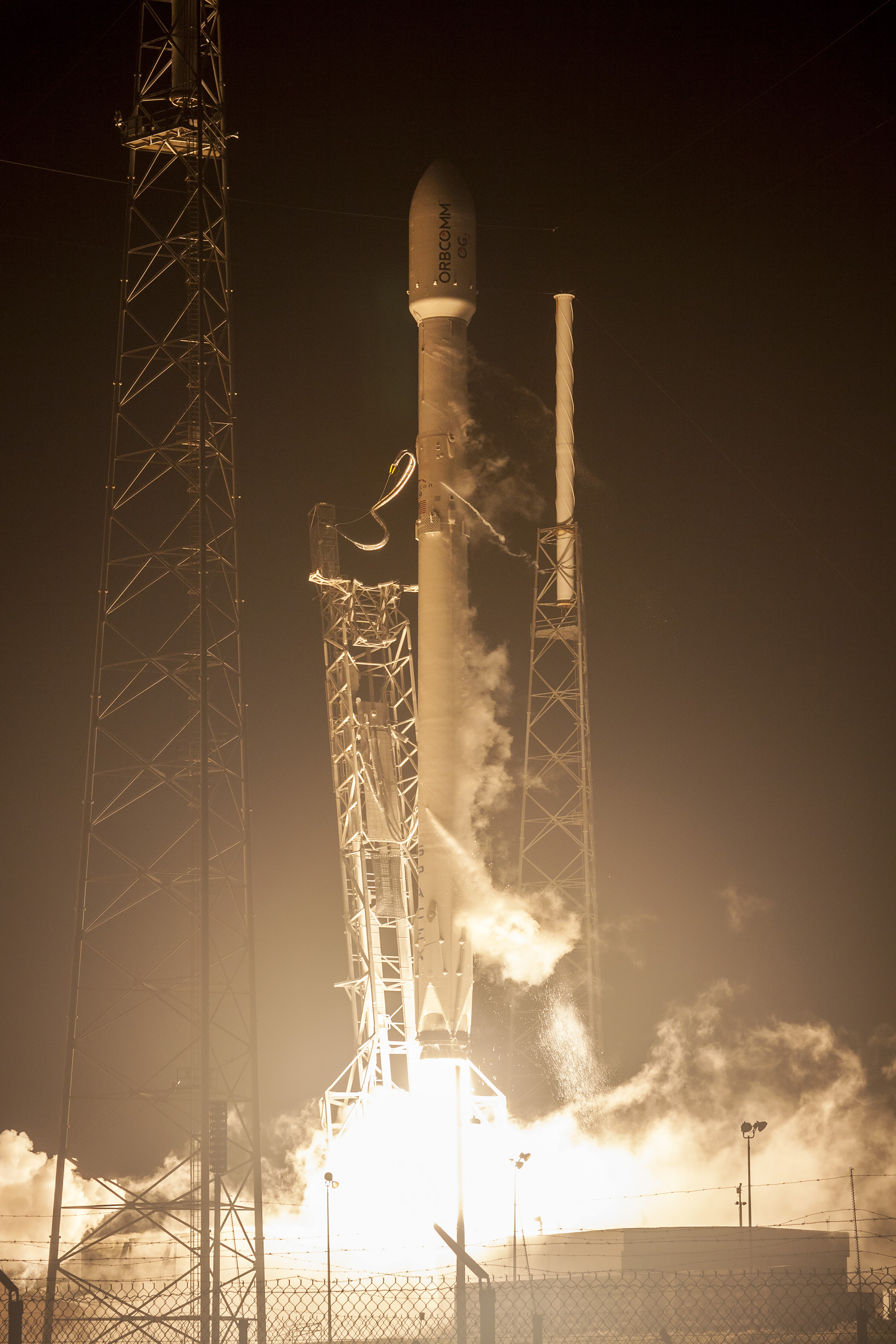
Launch of a set of Orbcomm communications satellites atop a Falcon 9 rocket from SLC-40 in 2015

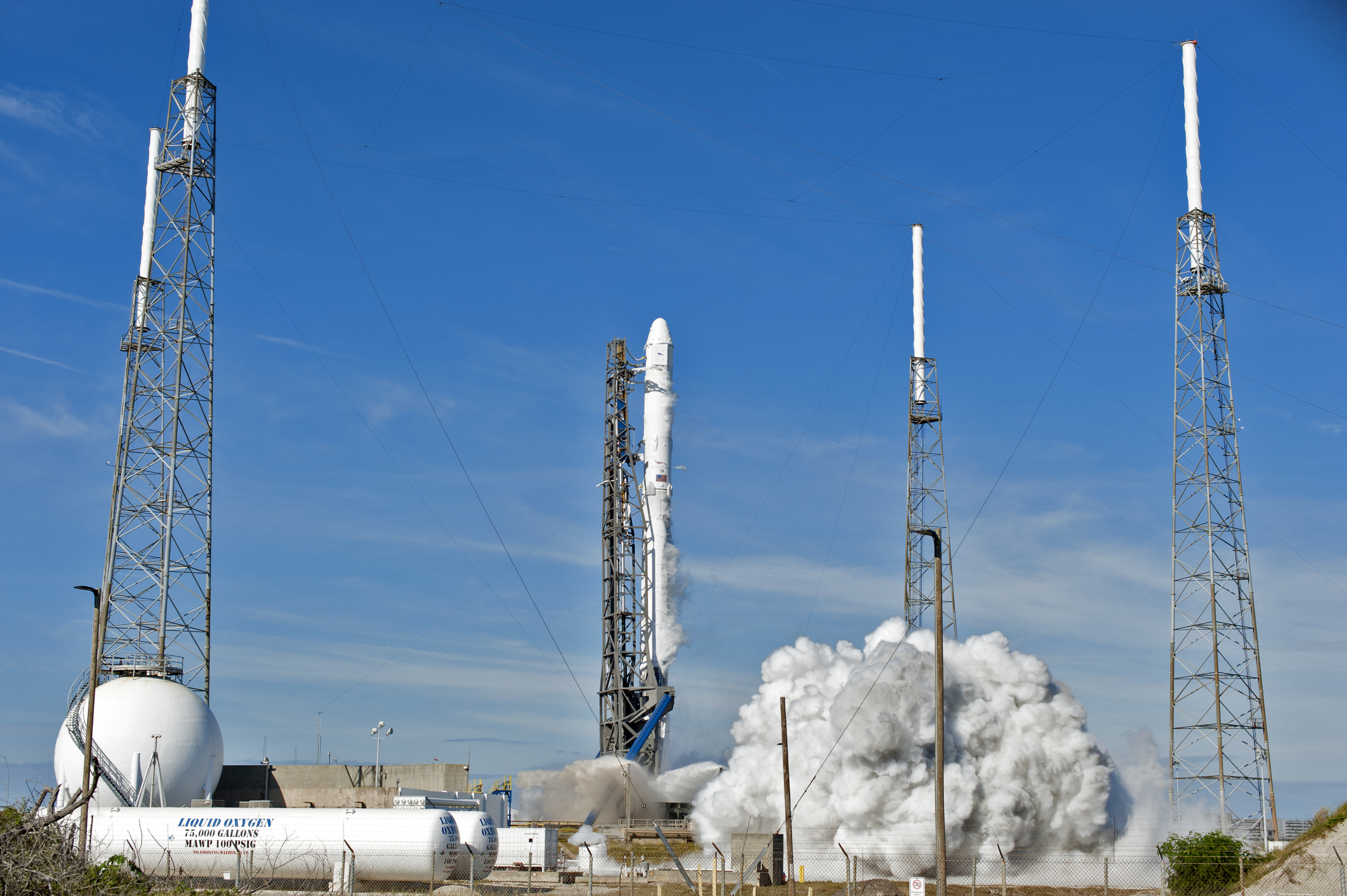
SLC-40 during launch of SpaceX CRS-13 in December 2017, after repair and upgrade works to the pad between 2016–2017

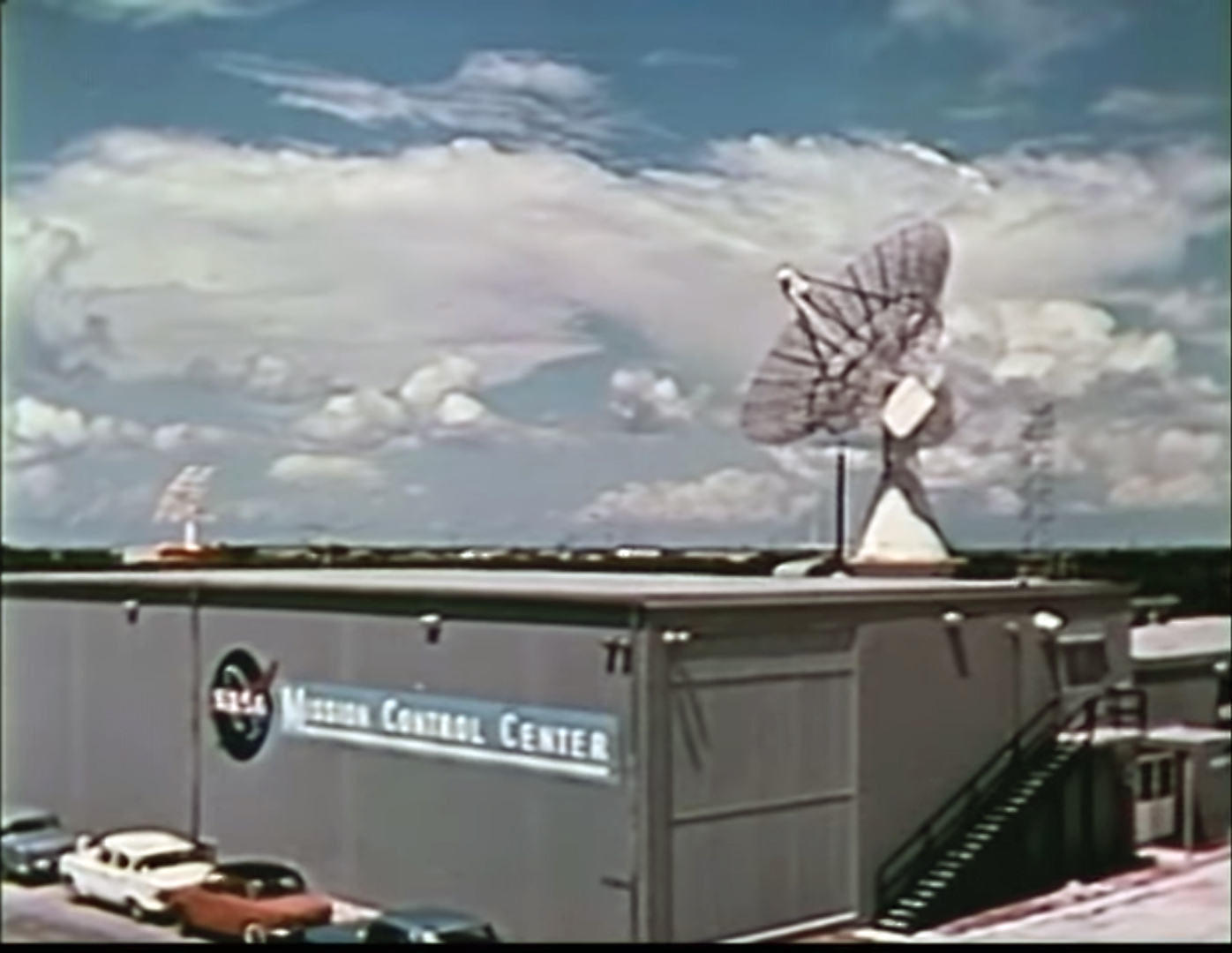
Mission Control Center used for Mercury Program and Gemini III

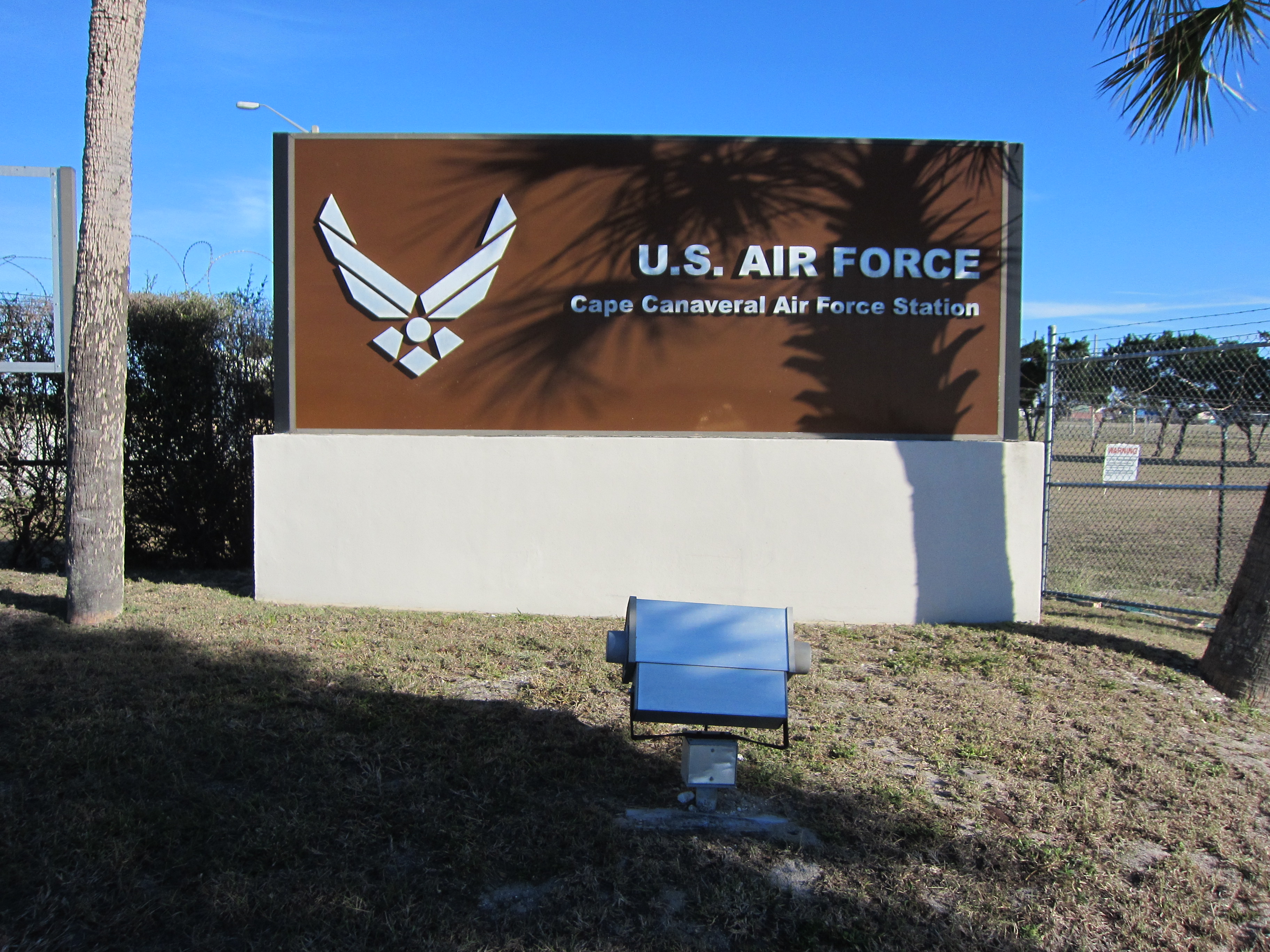
The sign located at the entrance to Cape Canaveral Space Force Station (then known as Cape Canaveral Air Force Station)

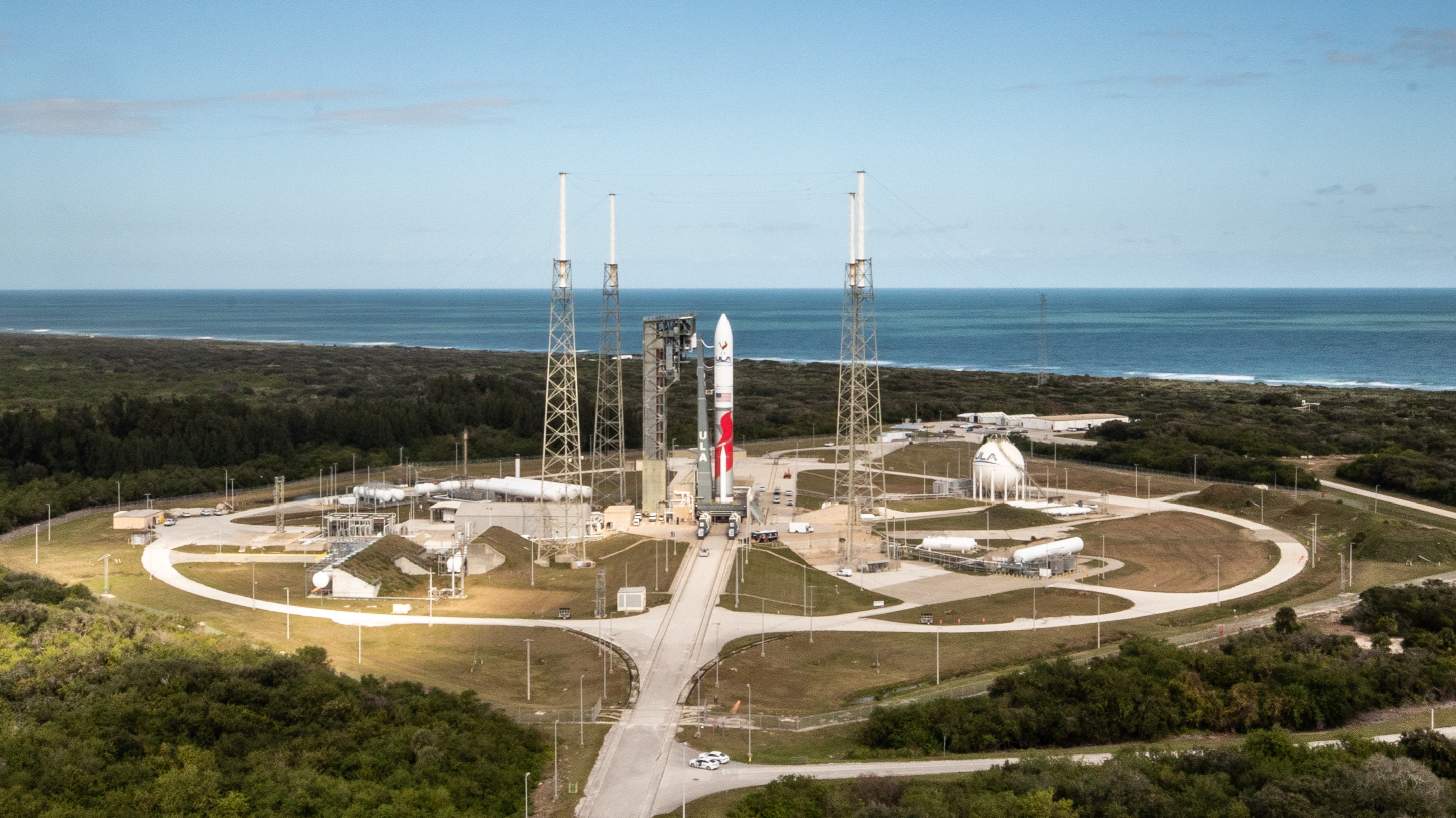
An aerial view of SLC-41 with its crew access tower and arm prior to the first launch of Vulcan Centaur carrying Peregrine Mission One

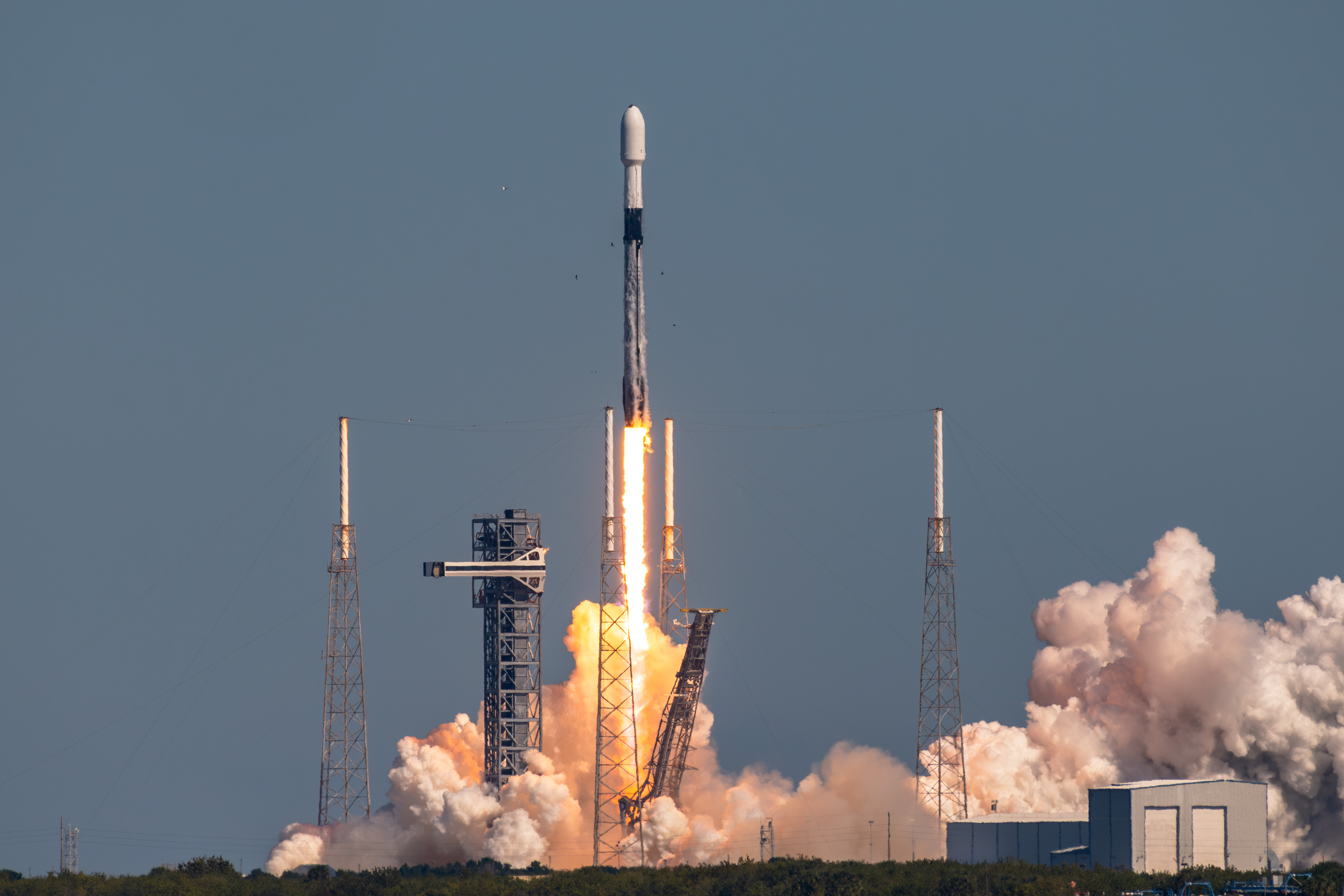
SLC-40 during launch of Cygnus NG-20 in January 2024, after Crew Access Tower and Arm installation

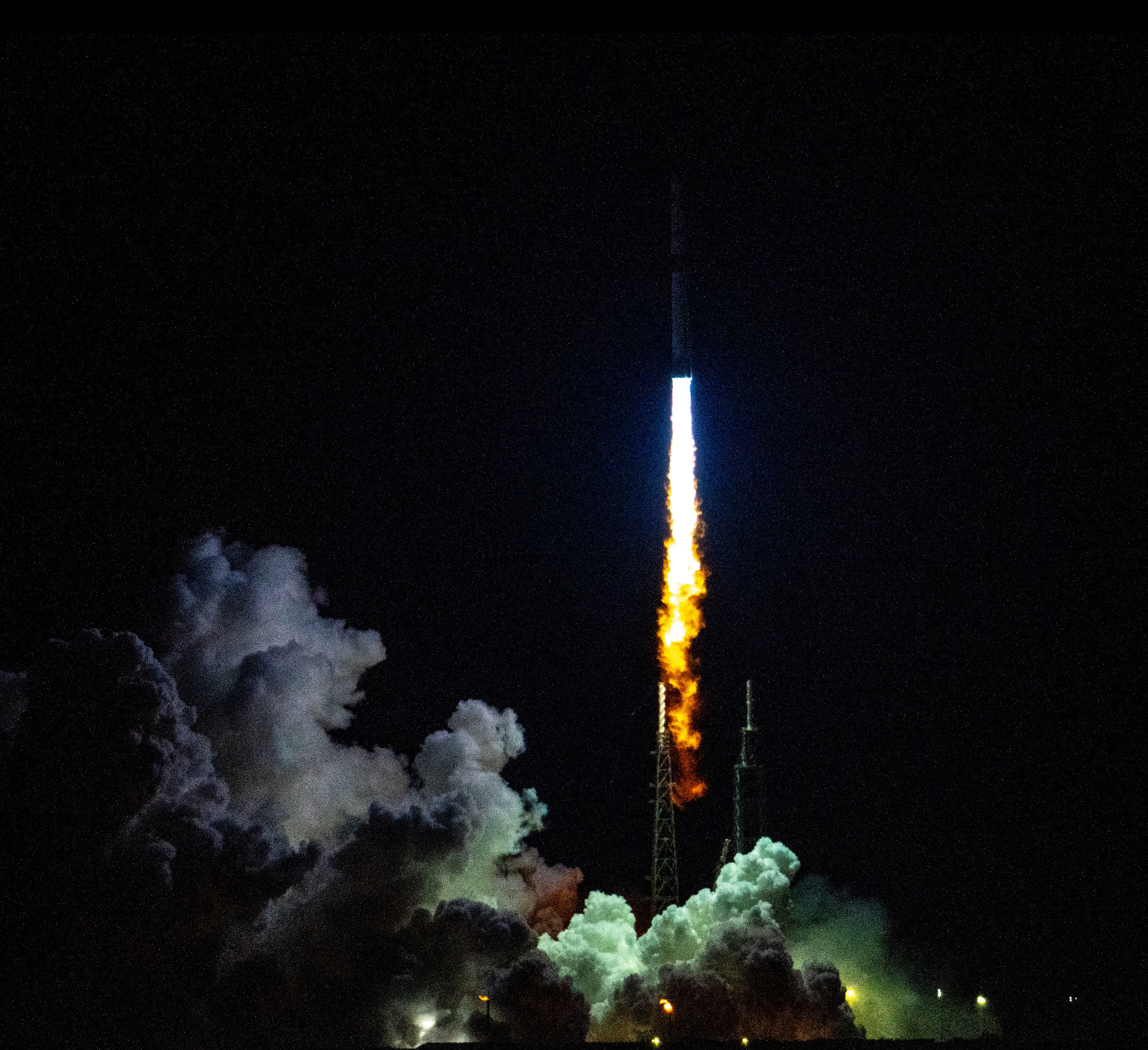
LC-36 in January 2025, during the first launch of New Glenn

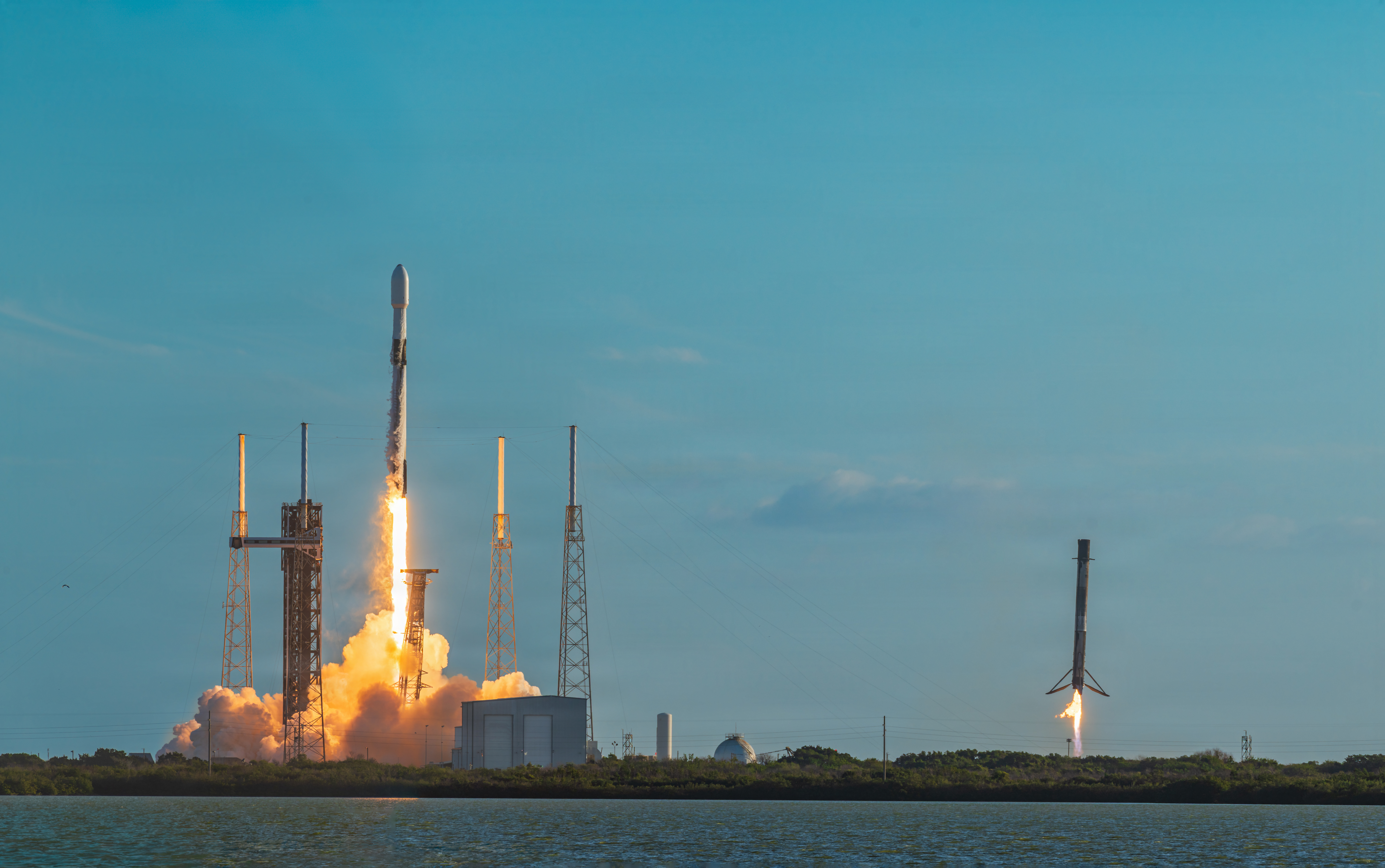
Composite image of NG-24 launch from SLC-40 and subsequent booster landing at LZ-40, capturing both events 8 minutes apart

== Media ==
In addition to being frequently featured in documentaries, Cape Canaveral has been portrayed on film many times, although often conflated with the adjoining Kennedy Space Center. Some studio movies have even gained access and filmed scenes within the gates of the space center. If extras are needed in those scenes, space center employees are recruited (employees use personal time during filming). Films with scenes at Cape Canaveral include:

- Moonraker
- Stowaway to the Moon
- SpaceCamp
- Apollo 13
- Contact
- Armageddon
- Space Cowboys
- Swades
- Transformers: Dark of the Moon
- Tomorrowland
- Sharknado 3: Oh Hell No!
- First Man
- Geostorm
- Men in Black 3
- Fly Me to the Moon
- Simon

The location appears as a major plot point in the finale of Stone Ocean, the 6th part of the manga and anime series JoJo's Bizarre Adventure. It is also mentioned in the 5th season of the series.

Cape Canaveral and KSC is also one of the two primary settings of the 1965–1970 television series I Dream of Jeannie (along with a home in nearby Cocoa Beach), though it was filmed entirely in Los Angeles.

== See also ==
- List of Cape Canaveral and Merritt Island launch sites

== Sources ==
- "Launch Site Safety Assessment, Section 1.0 Eastern Range General Range Capabilities" (PDF). Research Triangle Institute, Center for Aerospace Technology (CAST), Florida Office. Federal Aviation Administration. March 1999. Archived from the original (PDF) on March 26, 2009.
