= Falcon Heavy test flight =

First successful launch attempt of Falcon Heavy rocket

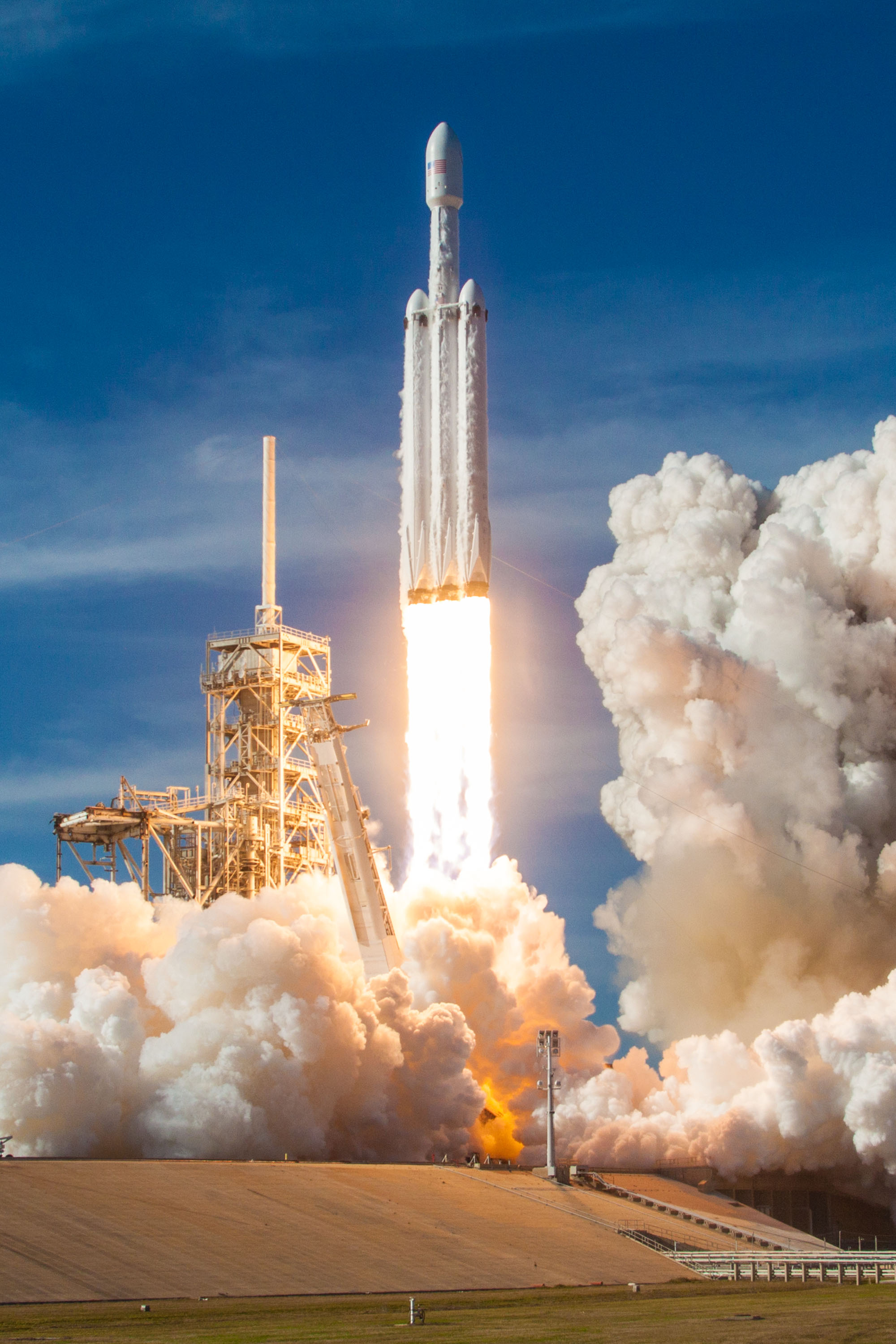
- Falcon Heavy launching from LC-39A

Falcon Heavy launch
- Launch: February 6, 2018; 8 years ago, 20:45 UTC
- Operator: SpaceX
- Pad: Kennedy LC-39A
- Payload: Elon Musk's Tesla Roadster
- Outcome: Success

Components
- Boosters: B1023 and B1025
- First stage: B1033
- Official insignia for the flight

Falcon launches

The Falcon Heavy test flight (also known as the Falcon Heavy demonstration mission) was the first attempt by SpaceX to launch a Falcon Heavy rocket on February 6, 2018, at 20:45 UTC. The successful test introduced the Falcon Heavy as the most powerful rocket in operation at the time, producing five million pounds-force (22 MN) of thrust and having more than twice the payload capacity of the next most powerful rocket, United Launch Alliance's Delta IV Heavy.

== Preparation ==
In April 2011, SpaceX was planning for a first launch of Falcon Heavy from Vandenberg Air Force Base on the West Coast in 2013. It refurbished Launch Complex 4E at Vandenberg AFB to accommodate Falcon 9 and Heavy. The first launch from the Cape Canaveral East Coast launch complex was planned for late 2013 or 2014.

Due partly to the failure of SpaceX CRS-7 in June 2015, SpaceX rescheduled the maiden Falcon Heavy flight in September 2015 to occur no earlier than April 2016, but by February 2016 had postponed it again to late 2016. The flight was to be launched from the refurbished Kennedy Space Center Launch Complex 39A.

In August 2016, the demonstration flight was moved to early 2017, then to summer 2017, to late 2017 and to January 2018.

At a July 2017 meeting of the International Space Station Research and Development meeting in Washington, D.C., SpaceX CEO Elon Musk downplayed expectations for the success of the maiden flight:

There's a real good chance the vehicle won't make it to orbit ... I hope it makes it far enough away from the pad that it does not cause pad damage. I would consider even that a win, to be honest.

Musk went on to say the integration and structural challenges of combining three Falcon 9 cores were much more difficult than expected. The plan was for all three cores to land back on Earth after launch.

In December 2017, Musk tweeted that the dummy payload on the maiden Falcon Heavy launch would be his personal midnight cherry Tesla Roadster playing David Bowie's "Life on Mars", and that it would be launched into an orbit around the Sun that will take it as far out as Mars' orbit. He released pictures in the following days. The car has three cameras attached that provided "epic views".

On December 28, 2017, the Falcon Heavy was moved to the launch pad in preparation of a static fire test of all 27 engines, which was expected on January 19, 2018. However, due to the U.S. government shutdown that began on January 20, the testing and launch were further delayed.

The static fire test was conducted on January 24, 2018. Musk confirmed via Twitter that the test "was good" and announced the rocket would be launched in approximately one week.

== Mission overview ==
The mission was the test flight of the Falcon Heavy, intended to demonstrate the rocket's capabilities while gathering telemetry throughout the flight.

=== Payload ===
The payload, Elon Musk's original Roadster, mounted on the payload adapter inside the payload fairing

The Roadster is permanently attached to the upper stage of the Falcon Heavy rocket.

The dummy payload for this test flight was a sports car, Tesla Roadster, owned by Elon Musk. SpaceX stated that the payload had to be "something fun and without irreplaceable sentimental value". Sitting in the driver's seat of the Roadster is "Starman", a dummy astronaut clad in a SpaceX spacesuit. It has his right hand on the steering wheel and left elbow resting on the open window sill. Starman is named for the David Bowie song "Starman". The car's sound system was looping the symbolic Bowie songs "Space Oddity" and "Life on Mars?".

It was launched with sufficient velocity to escape the Earth and enter an elliptic orbit around the Sun that crosses the orbit of Mars, reaching an aphelion (maximum distance from the Sun) of 1.66 AU. During the early portion of its voyage it functioned as a broadcast device, sending video back to Earth for four hours. The Roadster remains attached to the second stage.

This launcher demonstration made the Roadster the first consumer car sent into space. Three Lunar Roving Vehicles were sent to space on the Apollo 15, 16, and 17 missions in the 1970s, and these vehicles were left on the Moon. The Roadster is one of two formerly crewed vehicles (albeit not a crewed space vehicle) derelict in solar orbit, joining LM-4 Snoopy, Apollo 10's lunar module ascent stage.

Also, included was Arch Mission 1.2, which is a crystal disk containing Isaac Asimov's Foundation series of books, on the Tesla Roadster.

There is a copy of Douglas Adams' 1979 novel The Hitchhiker's Guide to the Galaxy in the glovebox, along with references to the book in the form of a towel and a sign on the dashboard that reads "Don't Panic!". A Hot Wheels miniature Roadster with a miniature Starman is mounted on the dashboard. A plaque bearing the names of the employees who worked on the project is underneath the car, and a message on the vehicle's circuit board reads "Made on Earth by humans".

=== Rocket configuration ===
Falcon Heavy flew in its reusable configuration, allowing for a landing approach of both side boosters and the central core. The side boosters consisted of two previously flown Falcon 9 first stages, being reused from the CRS-9 mission in July 2016 and the Thaicom 8 launch in May 2016. The central core was newly built because it needs to support stronger forces during ascent, so that a regular first stage could not be used. The upper stage was the same as on a Falcon 9.

Side boosters equipped with a nose cone have different aerodynamic properties than the usual Falcon 9 boosters with a cylindric interstage. For this reason, SpaceX equipped them with larger and sturdier grid fins made of titanium, to help guide the atmospheric descent accurately. The central core, however, still used conventional aluminum grid fins, as its aerodynamic properties are very similar to those of a conventional Falcon 9 first stage.

The Roadster was mounted on the second stage using a custom-made payload adapter, and was encapsulated in a conventional fairing. Falcon Heavy also supports the launch of Dragon capsules without a fairing.

Falcon Heavy stages
| Stage | Booster (Note: Bold entries are core boosters presumed available as active fleet: those which have not been expended, destroyed or officially retired.) | Version (Note: Entries with colored background and ♺ symbol denote flights using refurbished boosters from previous flights.) | Previous flight No. | Previous launch | Turnaround time | Previous payload | Landing outcome | Status |
|---|---|---|---|---|---|---|---|---|
| 1st (side) | B1023.2 ♺ | Full Thrust | F9-025 | May 27, 2016 | 1y 8m 10d | Thaicom 8 | Success | Retired |
| 1st (core) | B1033.1 | Heavy core | —N/a | —N/a | —N/a | —N/a | Failure | Destroyed |
| 1st (side) | B1025.2 ♺ | Full Thrust | F9-027 | July 18, 2016 | 1y 6m 21d | Dragon CRS-9 | Success | Retired |
| 2nd (upper) | —N/a | FT Vacuum Stage | —N/a | —N/a | —N/a | —N/a | No attempt | Expended |

=== Objectives ===
The Falcon Heavy maiden flight was intended to accomplish at least several of the following objectives:

- launch the Falcon Heavy from the pad through the atmosphere, including Max Q flight phase;
- separate the side booster cores from the continuing first stage center core and upper stage
- return the two side boosters to Cape Canaveral and land them simultaneously at Landing Zones 1 and 2
- separate the center core and light the upper stage to orbit insertion
- land the central first stage booster core on an autonomous spaceport drone ship, the Of Course I Still Love You, in the Atlantic Ocean
- relight the upper stage to orbit in the Van Allen belts for several hours to show radiation resistance
- relight the upper stage again to put the payload into its heliocentric orbit, demonstrating a lifetime for the upper stage suitable for geosynchronous orbit insertion.

The purpose of including the Roadster on the maiden flight was to demonstrate that the Falcon Heavy can launch payloads as far as the orbit of Mars, and it exceeded its projected route by extending its aphelion to near the asteroid belt beyond Mars (with a perihelion at the level of Earth's orbit), but did not test or demonstrate the separation of the second stage and a payload.

== Flight timeline ==
After a delay of over two hours due to high winds, the launch occurred at 3:45 PM EST, or 20:45 UTC, from Launch Complex 39A at Kennedy Space Center at Cape Canaveral, Florida; the Roadster was successfully placed in its orbit, and its two booster cores returned to land at Landing Zones 1 and 2 several minutes later. The sole objective not completed was the landing of the central core; while its fate was initially ambiguous due to signal loss and heavy smoke, Musk confirmed several hours after the launch that the booster had not survived the recovery attempt. Because two of the three engines necessary to land were unable to reignite, the booster hit the water at 500 kilometres per hour (300 mph), 100 metres (300 ft) away from the drone ship. The final upper stage transfer burn to solar orbit produced an orbit that will be beyond the orbit of Mars at its furthest point from the sun.

As the launch was a success, most planned events took place in the planned point of time. As the central core landing burn wasn't performed correctly, the exact time of the landing attempt is not known.

The mission timeline was (all times approximate):

| Start time | End time | Event |
|---|---|---|
| T−01:28:00 | | Go/no go for propellant load |
| T−01:25:00 | | RP-1 kerosene loading underway |
| T−00:45:00 | | Liquid-oxygen loading underway |
| T−00:07:00 | | Start of engine chill |
| T−00:01:00 | | Start of pre-launch checks |
| T−00:01:00 | | Propellant-tank flight pressurisation |
| T−00:00:45 | | Go/no go for launch |
| T−00:00:05 | | Side boosters start |
| T−00:00:03 | | Center booster starts |
| T−00:00:00 | | Liftoff |
| T+00:00:40 | | Side boosters throttled down |
| T+00:01:06 | | Max-Q (moment of peak mechanical stress on rocket) |
| ~T+00:01:10 | | Side boosters throttled up |
| ~T+00:02:10 | | Side boosters throttled down again |
| T+00:02:29 | | Booster engines cutoff (BECO) |
| T+00:02:33 | | Side cores separate from center core |
| T+00:02:50 | | Side cores begin boostback burn |
| T+00:03:04 | | Center core engine shutdown/main engine cutoff (MECO) |
| T+00:03:07 | | Center core and 2nd stage separates |
| T+00:03:15 | | 2nd stage engine starts |
| T+00:03:24 | | Center core begins boostback burn |
| T+00:03:49 | | Fairing deployment |
| T+00:06:41 | | Side cores begins entry burn |
| T+00:06:47 | | Center core begins entry burn |
| T+00:07:58 | | Side cores landing |
| T+00:08:19 | | Center core landing |
| T+00:08:31 | | 2nd stage engine cutoff (SECO) |
| T+00:28:22 | T+00:28:52 | 2nd stage engine restarts |
| T+00:28:52 | T+06:00:00 | 6 hour experiment on Van Allen radiation belts |
| T+06:00:00 | | 2nd stage engine restarts for a second time |

In the above table, events are color coded.

This event was a failure
This event was a success

== Outcome ==
=== Launch ===
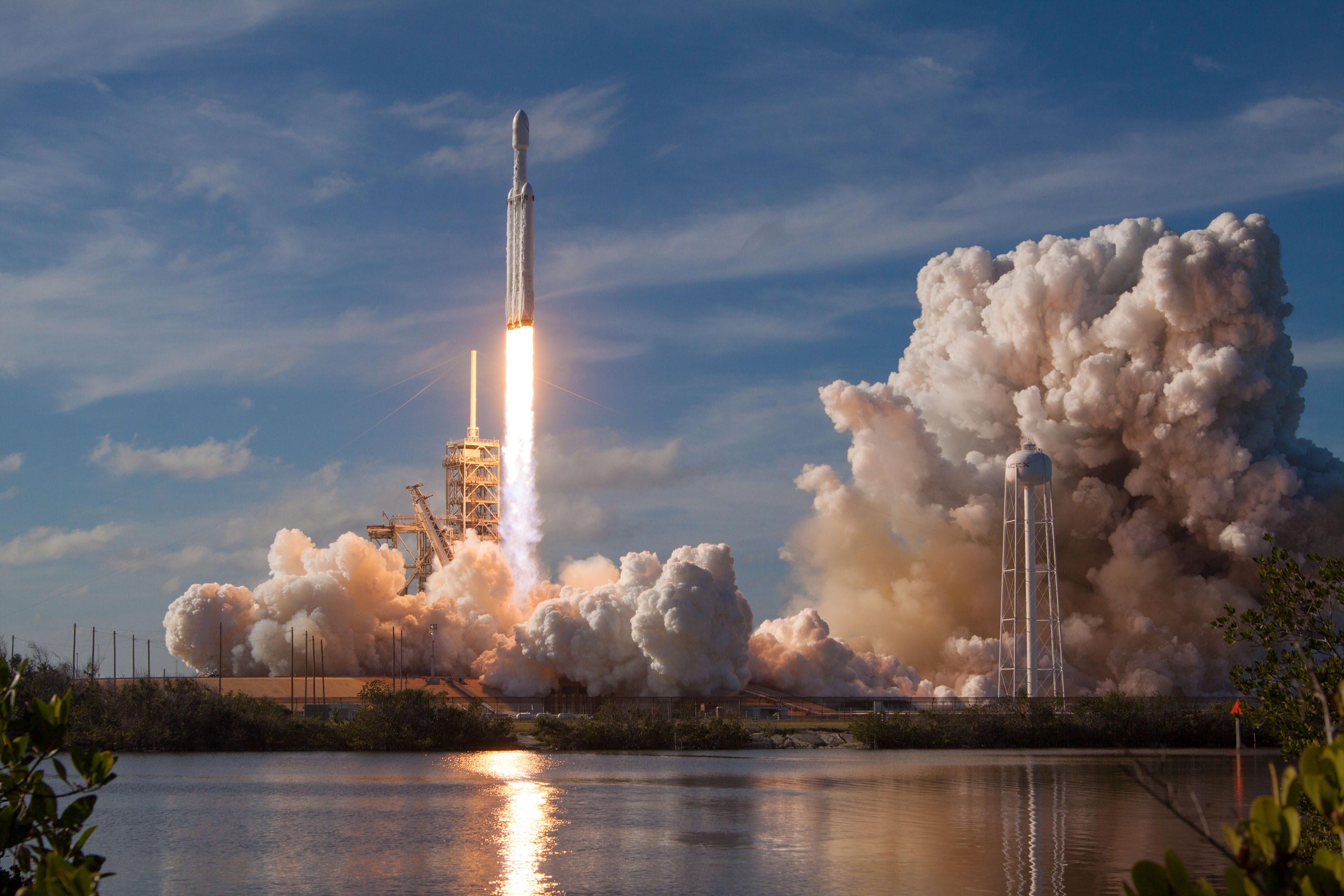
Launch from Kennedy Space Center

Although Elon Musk had publicly declared that there is a 50-50 chance of success, the rocket performed nominally and launched on schedule, followed by nominal separation of the side-boosters (first stage), and soon after, by the central core booster (second stage). Valuable telemetry data on the performance of the launch system and its components were obtained for all stages of the test flight.

=== Boosters ===
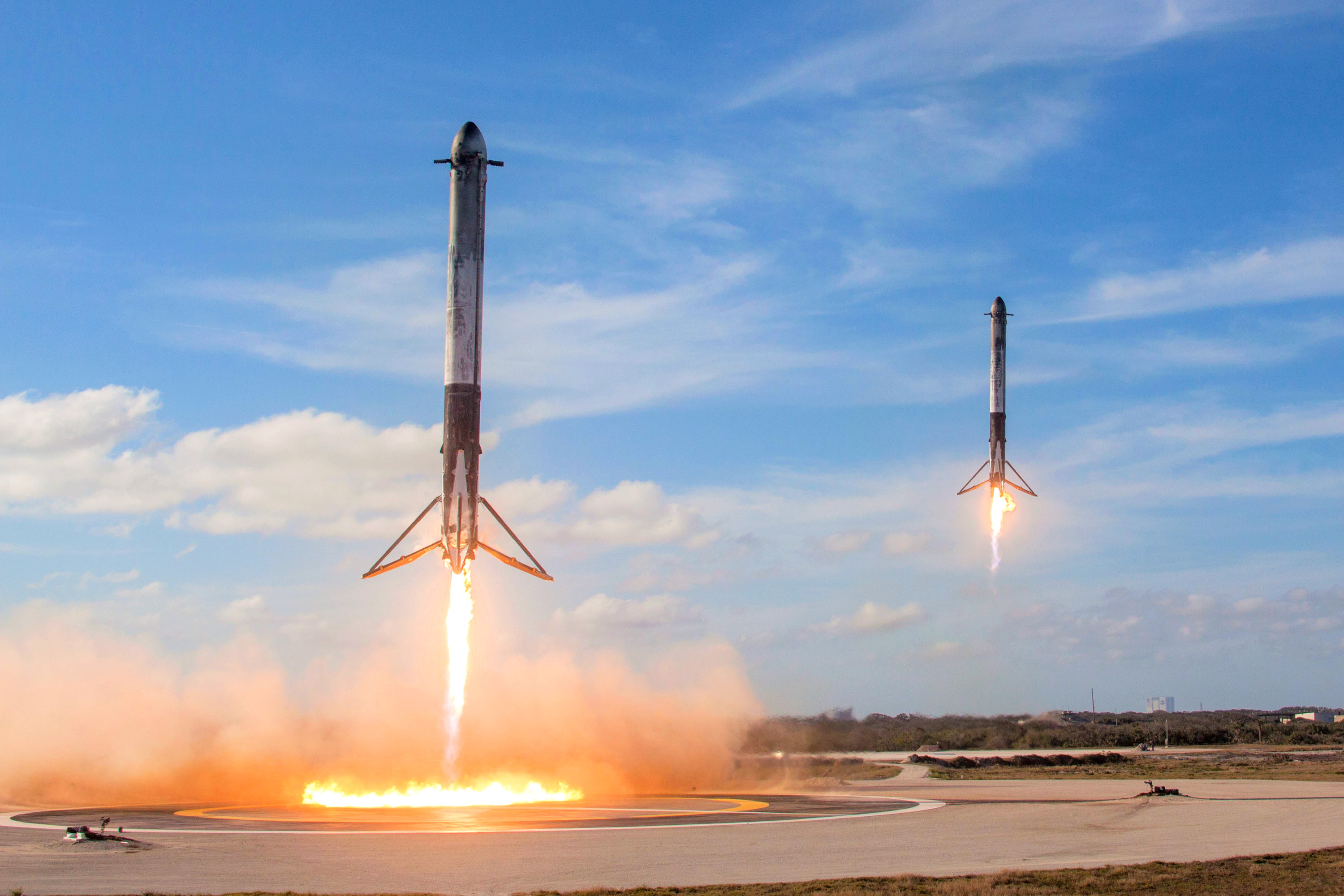
The two boosters landing at LZ-1 and LZ-2 at Cape Canaveral

Both boosters successfully landed almost simultaneously on the ground at Landing Zones 1 and 2 at Cape Canaveral Air Force Station. As the boosters were from an older generation of the Falcon 9 booster, SpaceX has ruled out using any of their major parts for a third mission. Due to the high cost and lengthy manufacturing process of the grid fins, however, those were reused on future flights.

=== Central core ===
The central core attempted to return to the autonomous spaceport drone ship "Of Course I Still Love You" but failed to light two of the three engines during the landing burn. The core crashed into the ocean 100 metres (300 ft) away from the drone ship at 500 kilometres per hour (300 mph), causing damage to two of the drone ship's station-keeping thrusters. According to Elon Musk on the post-flight conference, the central core ran out of triethylaluminium-triethylborane (TEA-TEB) igniter fluid. Musk later stated that the fix to this problem was "pretty obvious", which led many to believe SpaceX was simply going to add more ignition fluid on future missions. As SpaceX was phasing out Block 3 and starting the transition to only use Block 5 hardware for future Falcon 9 launches, the Block 3 center core loss did not impact future SpaceX operations.

=== Final stage ===
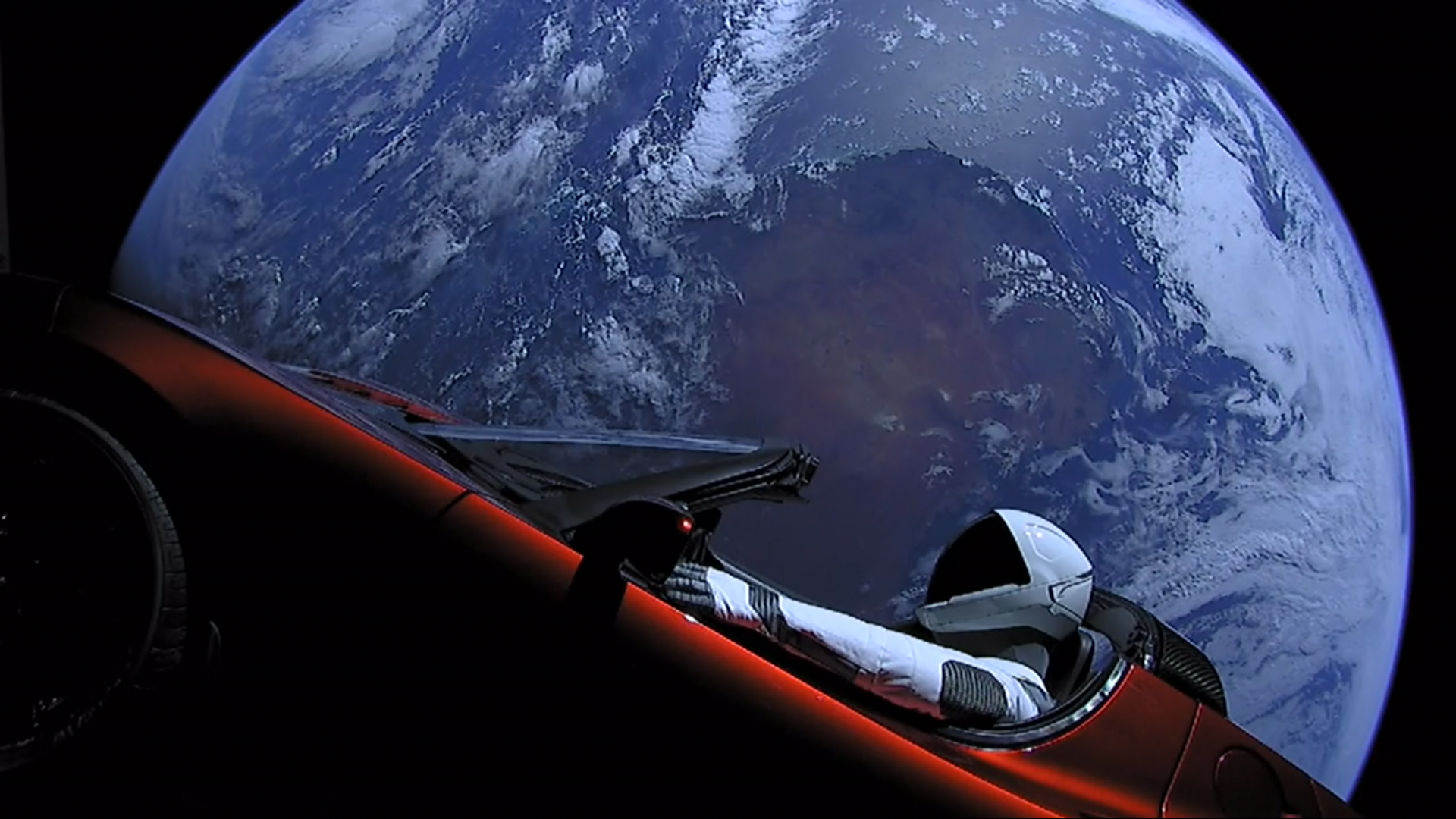
"Starman" seated in the Roadster over Australia

After reaching a parking orbit, the second stage fired again to place the dummy payload in an elliptical orbit around Earth, then fired once again to place it into a heliocentric orbit, with an aphelion of 1.66 AU, beyond Mars. The payload has an orbital period of 1.53 years. A four hour live stream of the flight was posted on YouTube, beginning just under one hour after liftoff. The last image released to the public was taken after the second stage finished burning all of its fuel, and showed Starman leaving Earth behind. Batteries were expected to last about 12 hours. NASA added the second stage to its database for tracking Solar System objects, and it is not expected to make any close encounters with Earth before 2091.

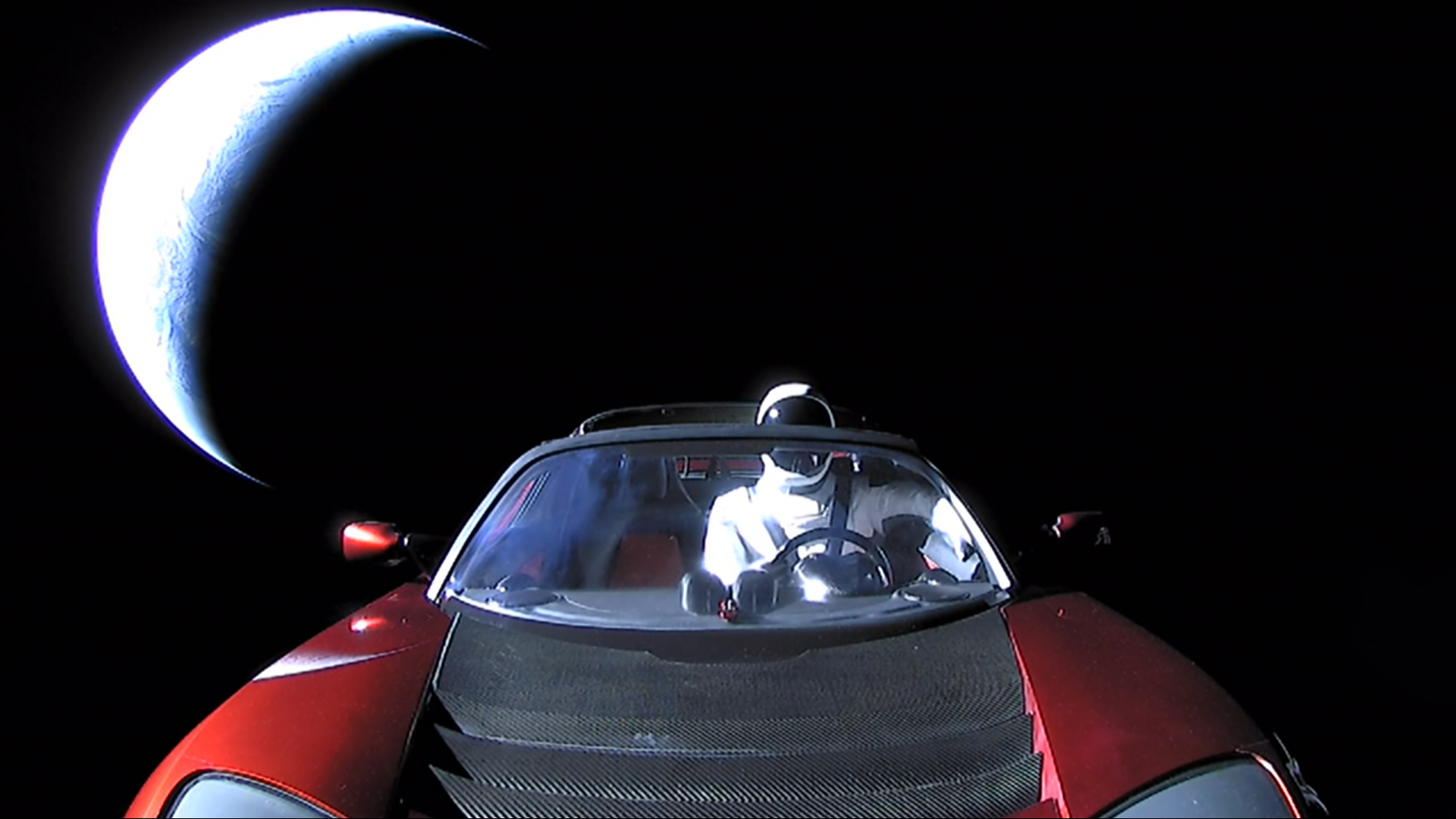
Last transmitted view en route away from Earth and after the final burn was completed

== Reactions ==
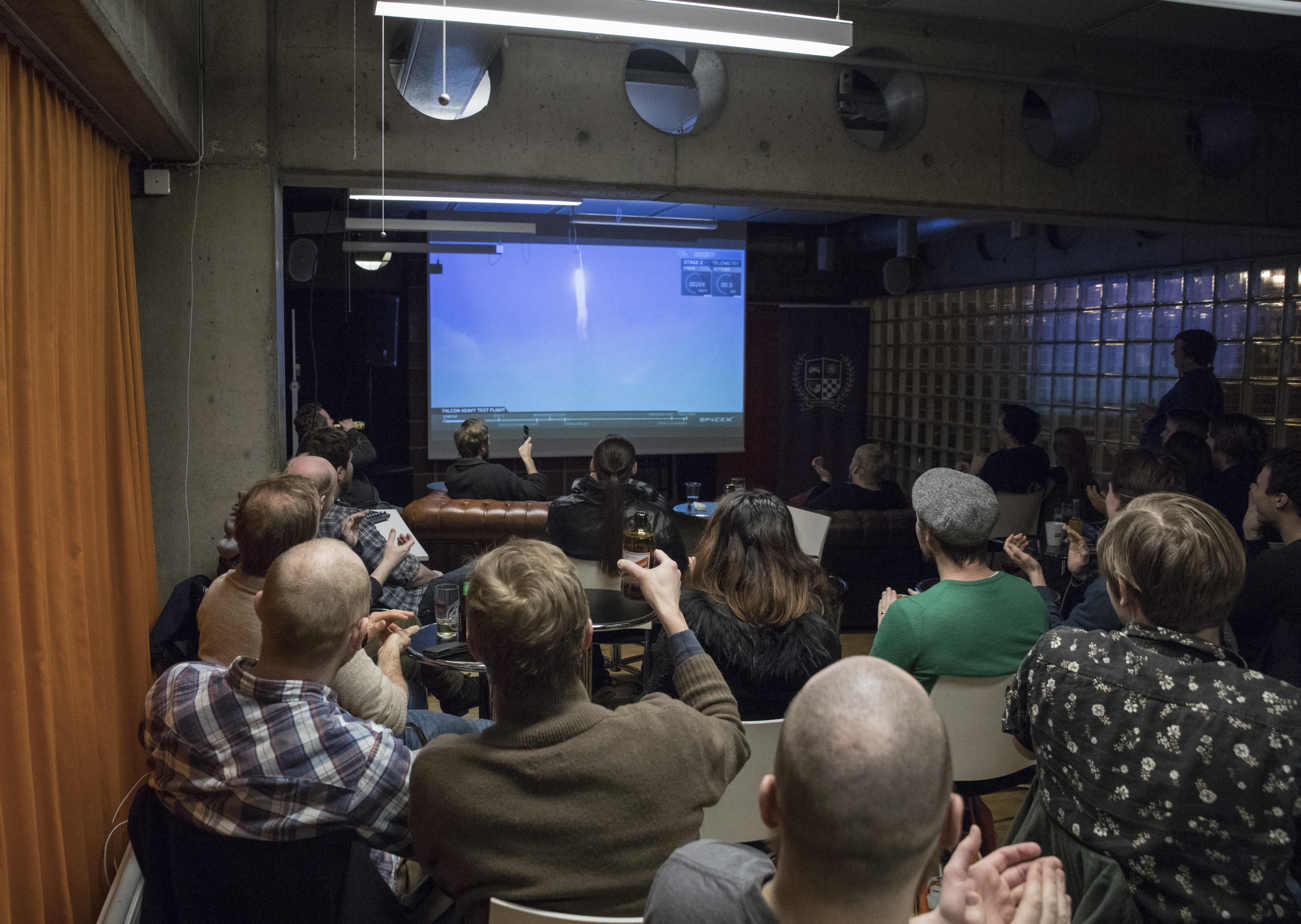
Viewing party watching the Falcon Heavy maiden launch stream

The test flight was a viral event, attracting extensive news coverage and media attention worldwide, and becoming a subject of many Internet memes and parodies. With over 2.3 million viewers seeing the launch live, the webcast of the Falcon Heavy test flight was at the time the second most watched livestream ever on YouTube. Approximately 100,000 people watched the launch from Cape Canaveral.

This launch won both the SpaceNews's Award and Readers' Choice's Award of Breakthrough of the Year in 2018, and inspired technology enthusiasts and start-ups to pay tribute to the Falcon Heavy and its payload.

U.S. President Donald Trump tweeted:

Congratulations @ElonMusk and @SpaceX on the successful #FalconHeavy launch. This achievement, along with @NASA’s commercial and international partners, continues to show American ingenuity at its best!

Former NASA Deputy Administrator Lori Garver advocated the cancellation of the Space Launch System program as a result of the success of this demonstration. The chairman of the Indian Space Research Organisation, K. Sivan, congratulated Musk and called the launch "a quantum leap in space technology".

Later, Elon Musk released a video highlighting the flight, and thanking fans.

Life cannot just be about solving one sad problem after another. There need to be things that inspire you, that make you glad to wake up in the morning and be part of humanity. That is why we did it. We did for you.

== Gallery ==
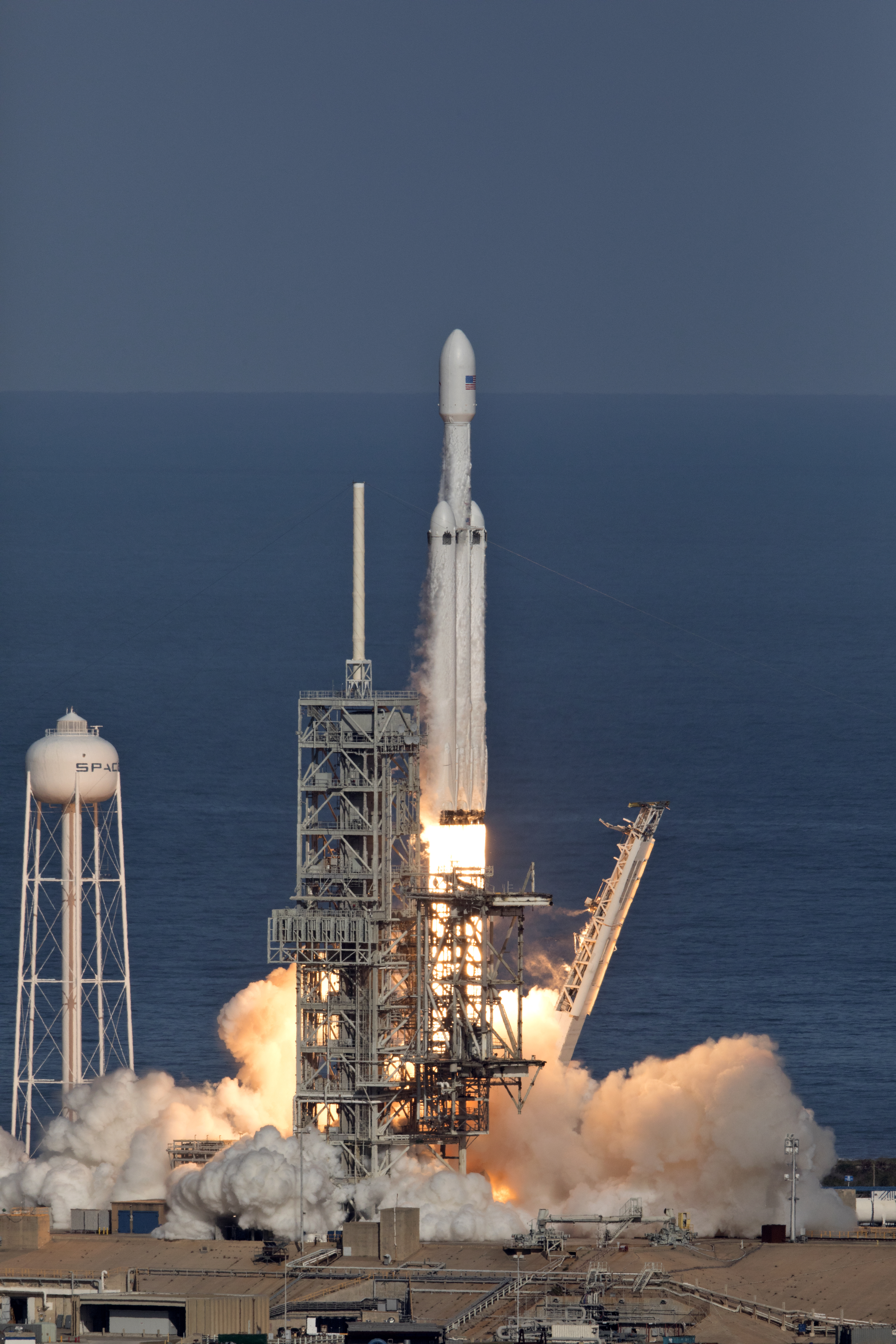
First launch of the Falcon Heavy

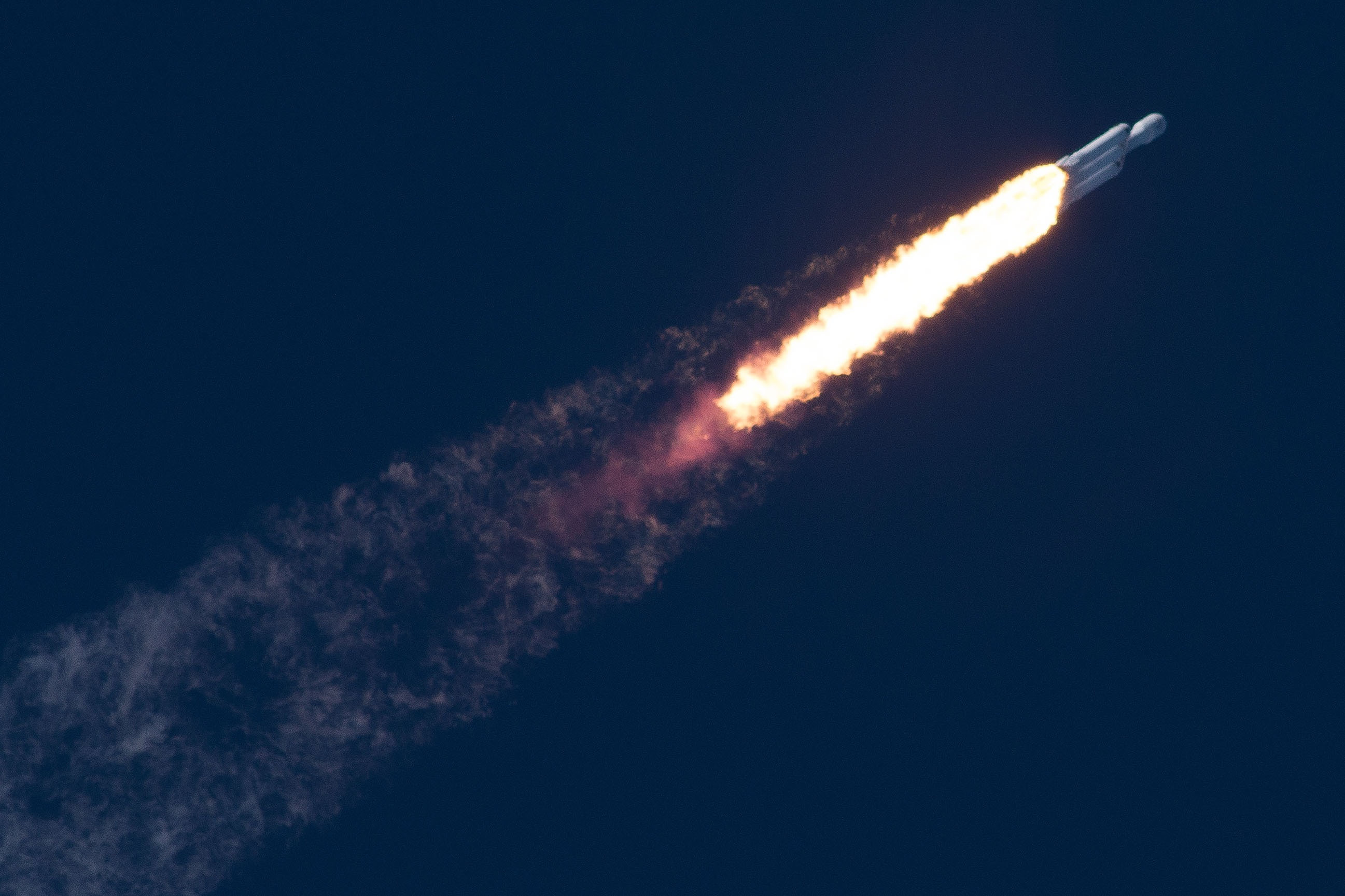
Falcon Heavy ascending

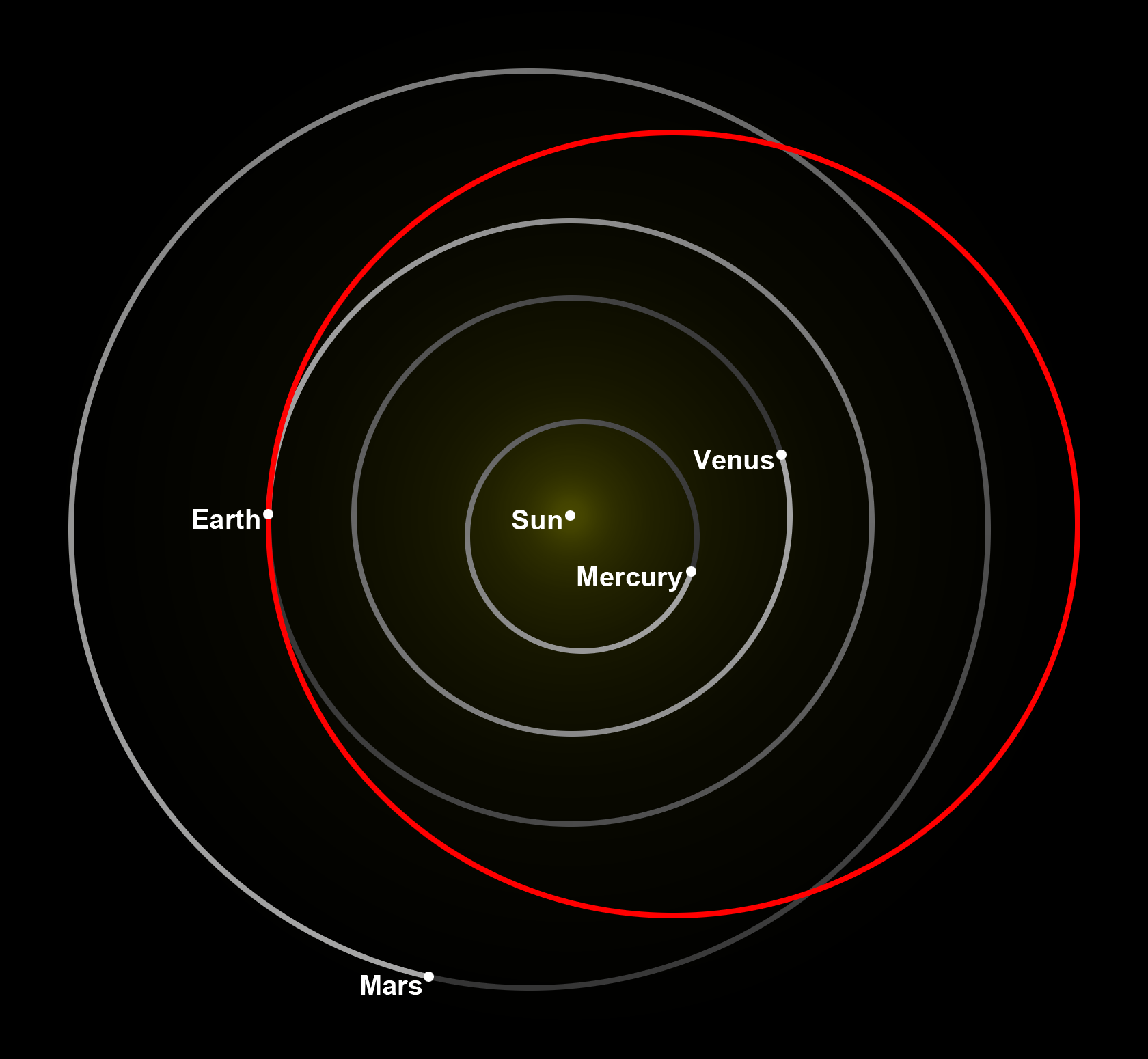
Expected elliptical orbital path outside Mars

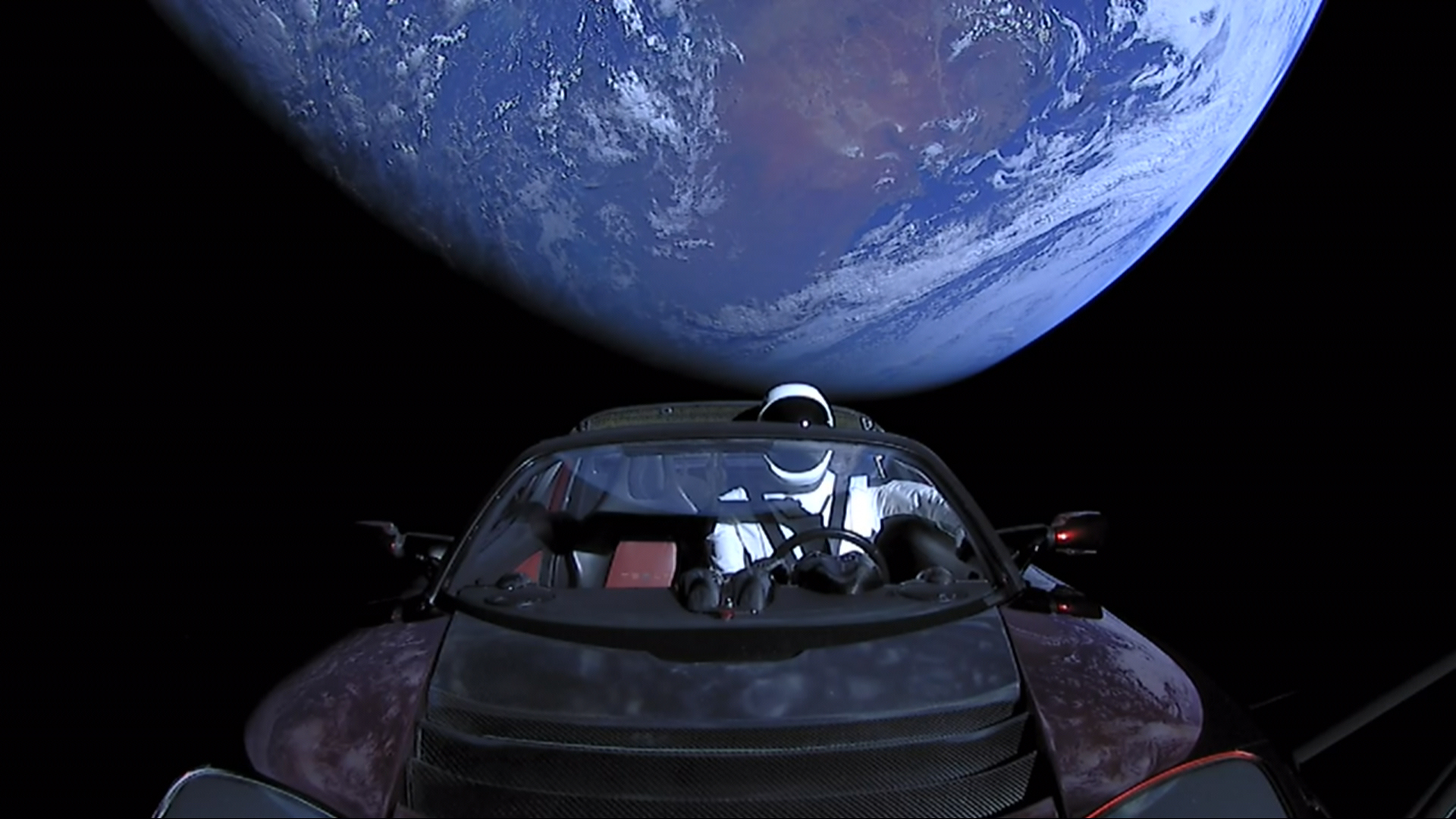
Roadster with Starman in orbit

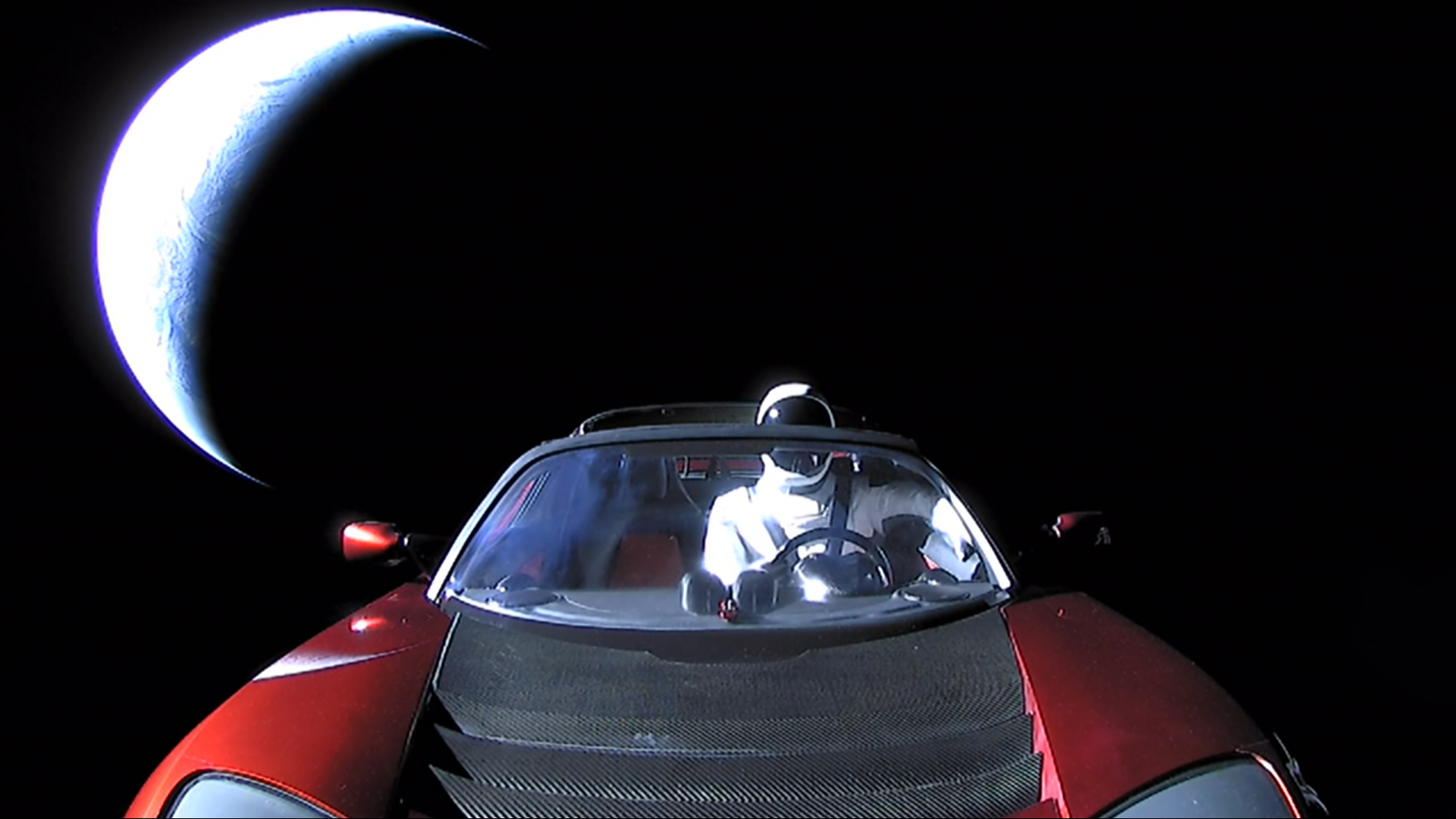
Last transmitted view of "Starman"

== See also ==
- Starship flight test 1
- Timeline of private spaceflight
