= Landing Zones 1 and 2 =

SpaceX's landing facility at Cape Canaveral Space Force Station

Landing Zone 1 and 2
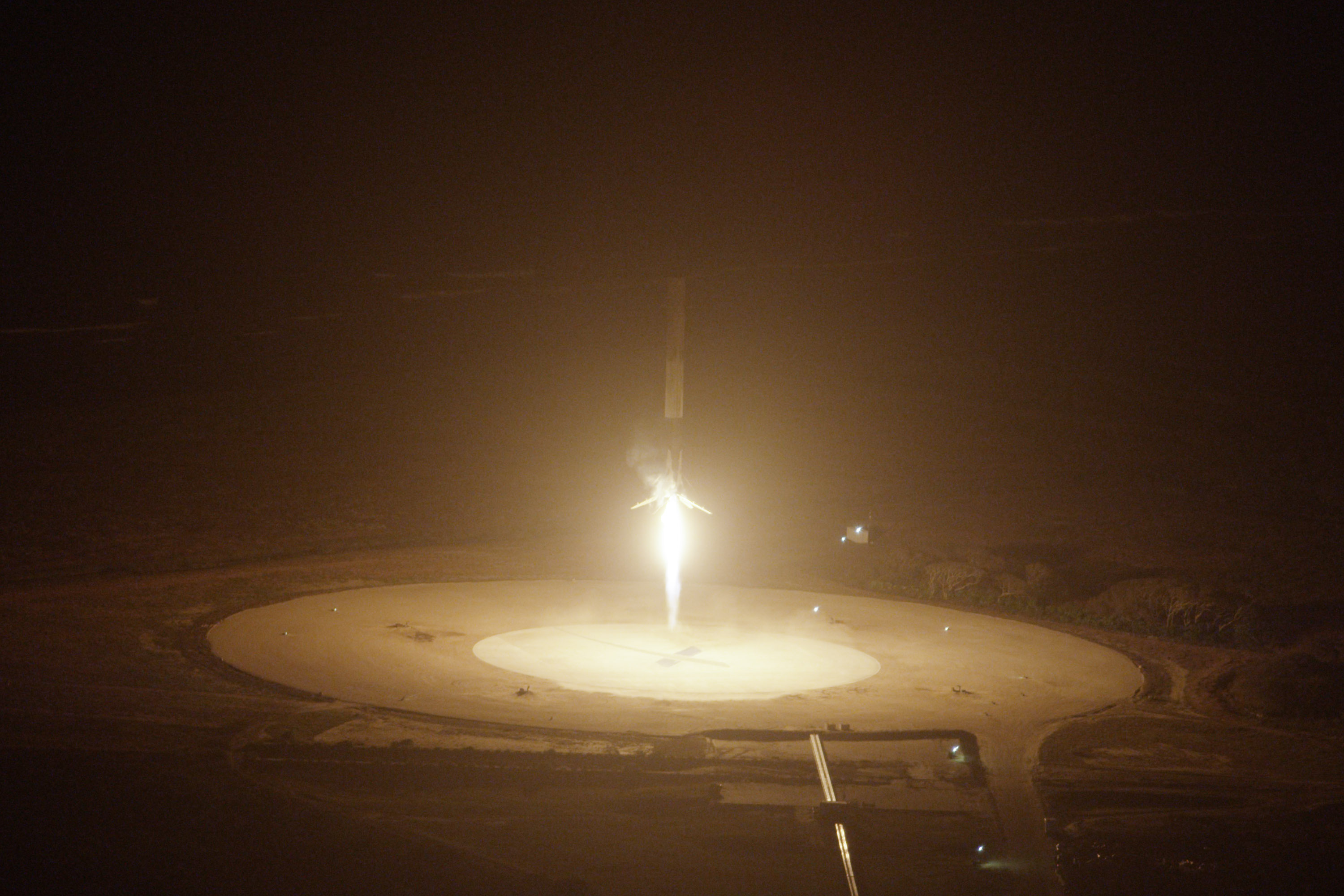
- The first-stage booster core B1019 of Falcon 9 flight 20 approaching Landing Zone 1 in December 2015
- Interactive map of Landing Zone 1 and 2
- Launch site: Cape Canaveral Space Force Station
- Coordinates: 28°29′09″N 80°32′40″W
- Short name: LZ-1, LZ-2
- Operator: SpaceX
LZ-1 landing history
- Status: Retired
- Landings: 55 (54 successful, 1 failure)
- First landing: 21 December 2015 (Falcon 9 flight 20)
- Last landing: 2 October 2026 (NROL-97)
- Associated rockets: Falcon 9 Full Thrust, Falcon Heavy, Falcon 9 Block 5
LZ-2 landing history
- Status: Active
- Landings: 20 (all successful)
- First landing: 6 February 2018 (Falcon Heavy test flight)
- Last landing: 2 October 2026 (NROL-97)
- Associated rockets: Falcon Heavy, Falcon 9 Block 5

Landing Zone 1 and Landing Zone 2, also known as LZ-1 and LZ-2 respectively, are landing facilities at Cape Canaveral Space Force Station used by SpaceX. They allowed the company to land the first stage of its Falcon 9 rocket or the two side boosters of its Falcon Heavy rocket.

The facilities were built on land leased in February 2015 on the site of Launch Complex 13. Landing Zone 1 saw its first use on 21 December 2015 when B1019 touched down during Falcon 9 flight 20. Landing Zone 2 was added ahead of the first Falcon Heavy test flight on 6 February 2018. During a Falcon Heavy launch, both LZs are used, allowing the two side boosters to land simultaneously.

On August 1, 2025, Landing Zone 1 was decommissioned following the SpaceX Crew-11 mission ahead of being reactivated as Space Launch Complex 13. Landing Zone 2 continues to be used for Falcon Heavy and Falcon 9 recoveries. SpaceX is constructing replacement landing zones adjacent to Launch Complex 39A and Space Launch Complex 40.

== Site ==
Landing Zones 1 and 2 are located at the location of the former Launch Complex 13, which has been demolished and replaced by two circular landing pads 282 feet (86 m) in diameter and marked with a stylized X from the SpaceX company logo. Four more 150 feet (46 m) diameter pads were initially planned to be built to support the simultaneous recovery of additional boosters used by the Falcon Heavy, although only one extra pad has been built. Planned infrastructure additions to support operations includes improved roadways for crane movement, a rocket pedestal area, remote-controlled fire suppression systems in case of a landing failure, and a large concrete foundation, away from the future three landing pads, for attaching the booster stage when taking the rocket from vertical to horizontal orientation.

Operations at the facility began after seven earlier landing tests by SpaceX, five of which involved intentional descents into the open ocean, followed by two failed landing tests on an ocean-going platform. As of March 2, 2015, the Air Force's sign for LC-13 was briefly replaced with a sign identifying it as Landing Complex. The site was renamed Landing Zone prior to its first use as a landing site. Elon Musk indicated in January 2016 that he thought the likelihood of successful landings for all of the attempted landings in 2016 would be approximately 70 percent, hopefully rising to 90 percent in 2017, and cautioned that the company expects a few more failures.

In July 2016, SpaceX applied for permission to build two additional landing pads at Landing Zone 1 for landing the boosters from Falcon Heavy flights.

In May 2017, construction began on a second, smaller landing pad known as Landing Zone 2 (LZ-2). Located approximately 1,017 feet (310 m) northwest of the original pad, LZ-2 is primarily used for landing side boosters of Falcon Heavy missions. By June 2017, the pad was enhanced with radar-reflective paint to improve landing precision.

As of August 2025, Falcon 9 boosters typically land on Landing Zone 1 (LZ-1) and only occasionally use LZ-2. One such exception occurred on December 11, 2022, during the Hakuto-R Mission 1, when booster B1073-5 landed on LZ-2. At the time, LZ-1 was occupied by booster B1069-4 from the OneWeb Flight #15 mission, launched on December 8, 2022. This marked the first time a Falcon 9 booster landed on LZ-2.

During a press conference ahead of the Crew-11 mission, William Gerstenmaier announced that the landing of booster B1094 would mark the final use of Landing Zone 1 (LZ-1). SpaceX's lease on the Launch Complex 13 site expired at the end of July 2025 and transitioned to joint use by Vaya Space and Phantom Space. Landing Zone 2 continues to be used for Falcon Heavy recoveries, with the vast majority of Falcon 9 landings being shifted to Landing Zone 40 (LZ-40) following the NROL-77 mission on December 9, 2025.

On February 13, 2026, SpaceX officially activated LZ-40 during the launch of their Crew-12 mission, a new landing zone located next to its launch facility at SLC-40. Although LZ-1 stays retired, it was temporarily reactivated to assist in the landing of Falcon Heavy booster B1104-2 on October 1, 2026 as part of the NROL-97 mission, as LZ-40 was already occupied by the boosted used during SpaceX's Crew-13 mission.

== Landing history ==
=== LZ-1 ===
- Falcon 9 Success
- Falcon Heavy Success
- Falcon 9 Failure
- Falcon Heavy Failure

=== LZ-2 ===
- Falcon 9 Success
- Falcon Heavy Success
- Falcon 9 Failure
- Falcon Heavy Failure

=== Booster landings ===
- Ground-pad failure
- Drone-ship failure
- Ocean test failure (Note: Controlled descent; ocean touchdown control failed; no recovery)
- Parachute test failure (Note: Passive reentry failed before parachute deployment)
- Ground-pad success
- Drone-ship success
- Ocean test success (Note: Controlled descent; soft vertical ocean touchdown; no recovery)
- No attempt

=== Detailed history ===
For landings at sea, see Autonomous spaceport drone ship

Launch sites at Cape Canaveral Space Force Station and Kennedy Space Center
Active pads
Inactive leased pads
Inactive unleased pads
Repurposed pads, not used for launches
1 LC-39B
2 LC-39A
3 LC-48
4 SLC-41
5 SLC-40
6 LC-47
7 SLC-37
8 LC-34
9 SLC-20
10 LC-19
11 LC-16
12 LC-15
13 LC-14
14 LC-13 (LZ-2)
15 LC-12
16 LC-11
17 LC-36
18 LC-1, LC-2, LC-3, and LC-4
19 SLC-46
20 LC-21 and LC-22
21 LC-31 and LC-32
22 LC-18
23 SLC-17
24 LC-26
25 LC-5 and LC-6
26 LC-30
27 LC-25
28 LC-29

After approval from the FAA, SpaceX accomplished its first successful landing at the complex with Falcon 9 flight 20 on December 22, 2015 UTC; this was the 8th controlled-descent test of a Falcon 9 first stage. A second successful landing at LZ-1 took place shortly after midnight, local time (EDT) on July 18, 2016, as part of the CRS-9 mission, which was the Falcon 9's 27th flight. The third successful landing was by the CRS-10 mission's first stage on February 19, 2017, which was the Falcon 9's 30th flight. Landing Zone 2 was first used by the maiden launch of Falcon Heavy on February 6, 2018, when the rocket's two side boosters touched down on LZ-1 and LZ-2. Later on, SpaceX will retire these two landing zones and add three landing zones for Falcon 9 and Falcon Heavy rockets to conduct to "Return-to-launch-site" landings, two at LC-39A and one at SLC-40. The last landing on LZ-1 occurred on 1 August 2025.

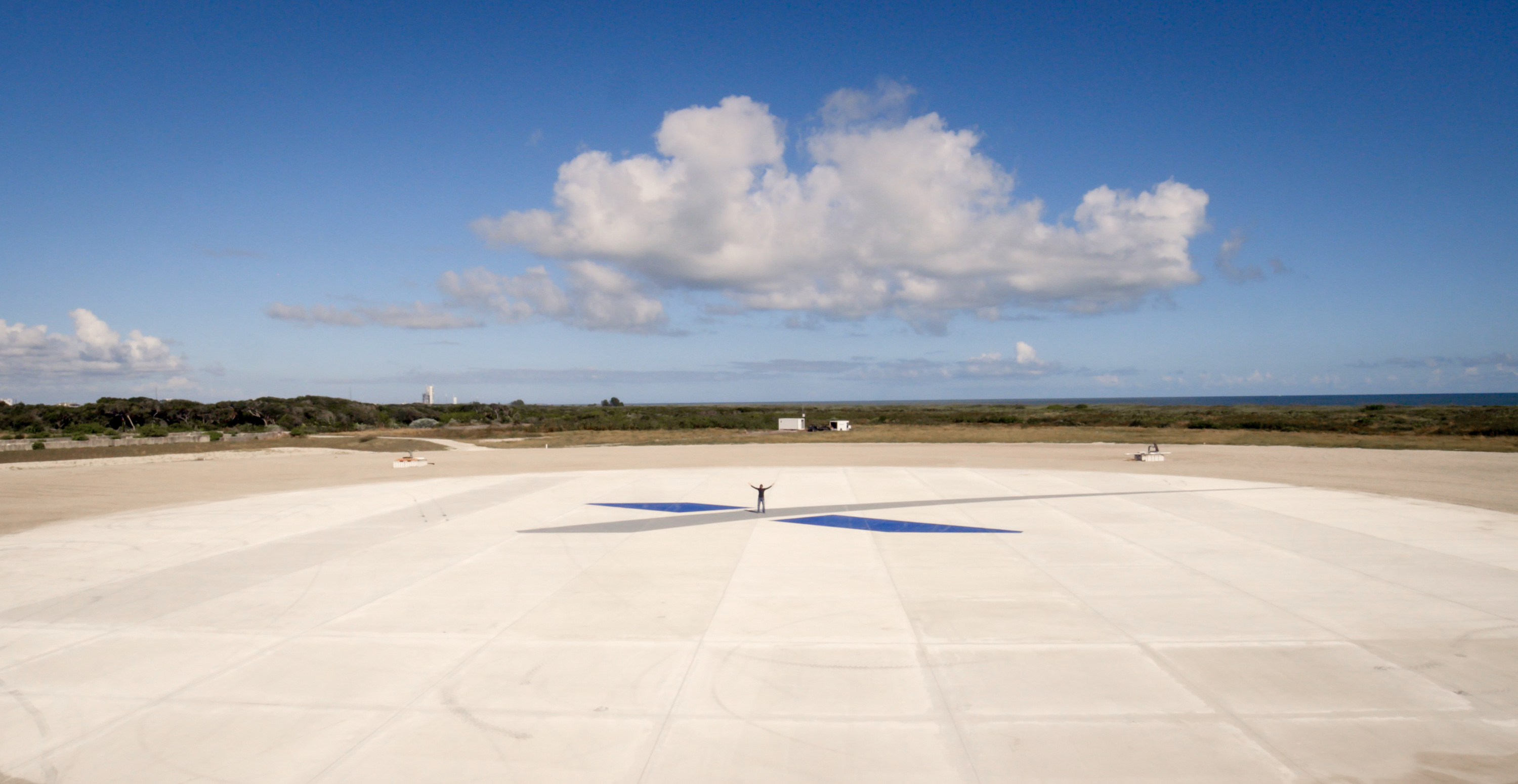
A person standing in the middle of the main landing pad demonstrates its size.

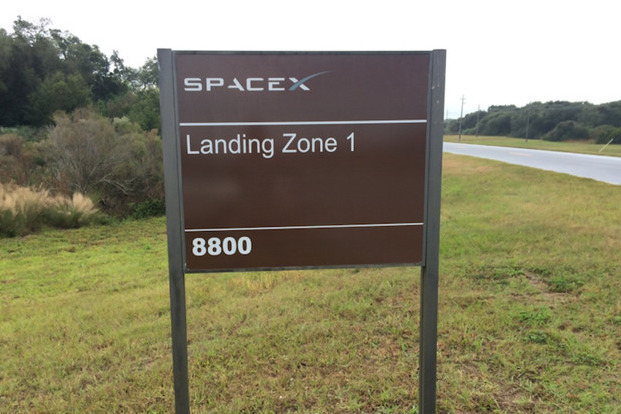
Sign at entrance to Landing Zone 1 site

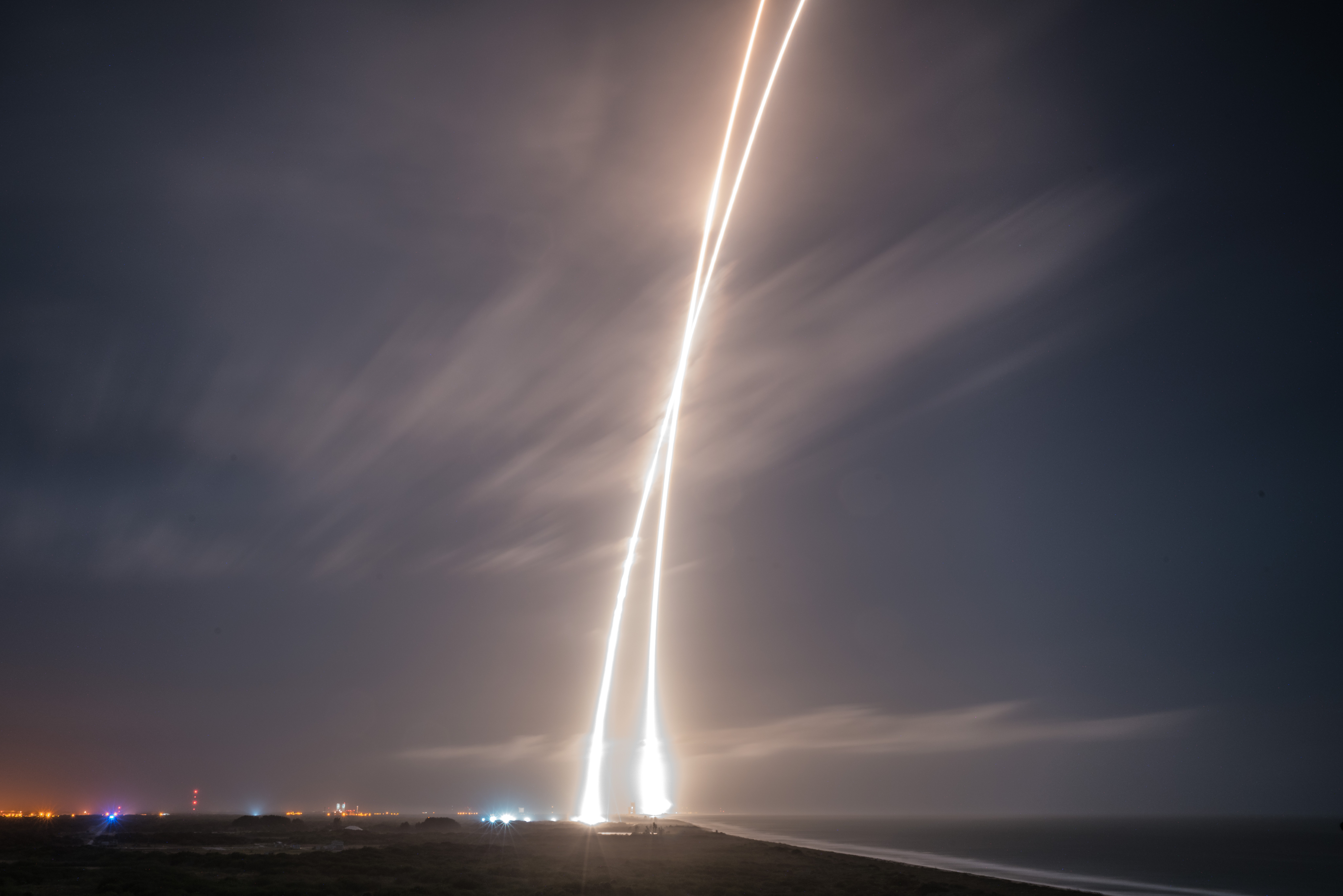
Launch and landing traces of Falcon 9 Flight 20, from launch pad SLC-40 to landing pad LZ-1

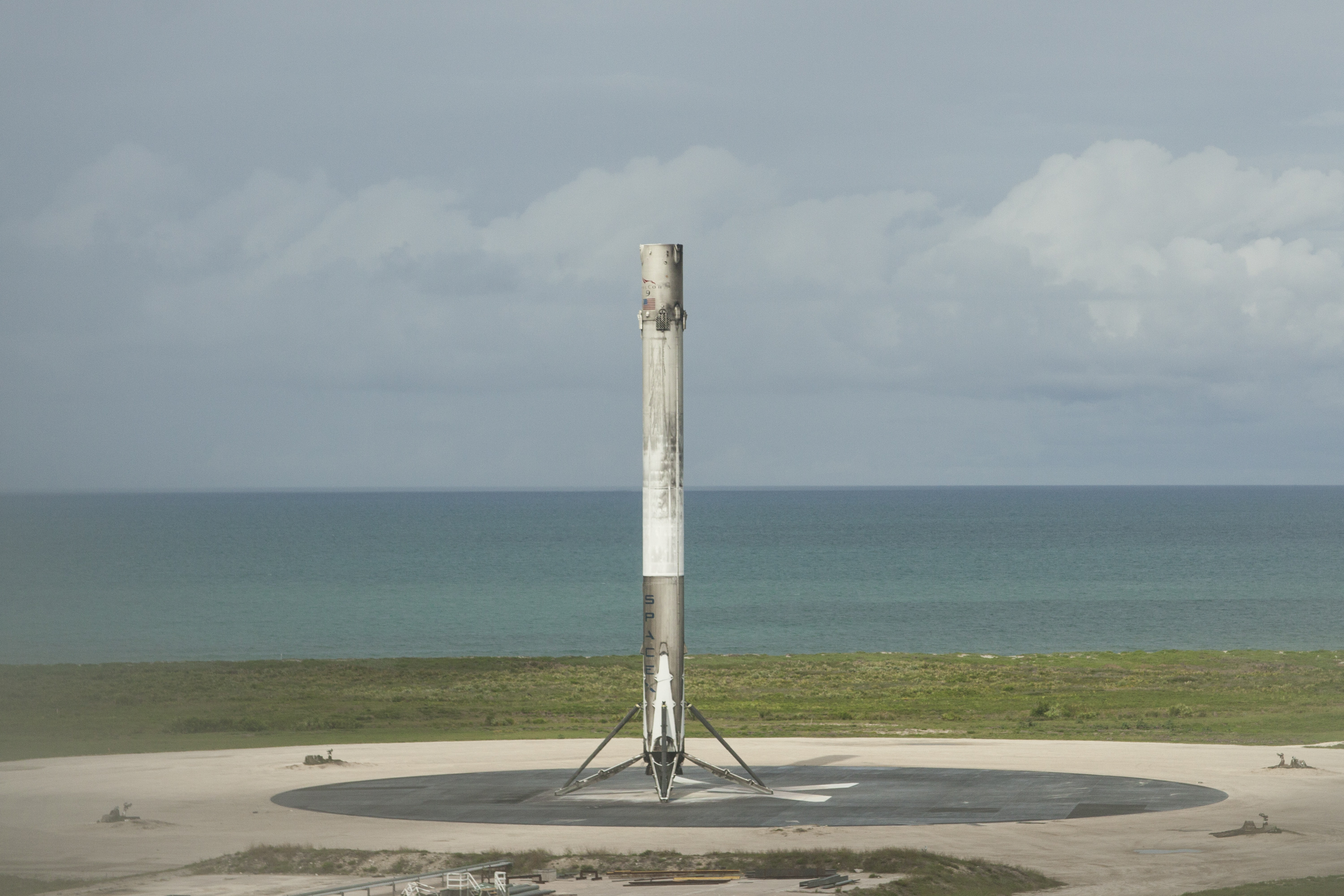
First stage of Falcon 9 Flight 35 on the pad after landing

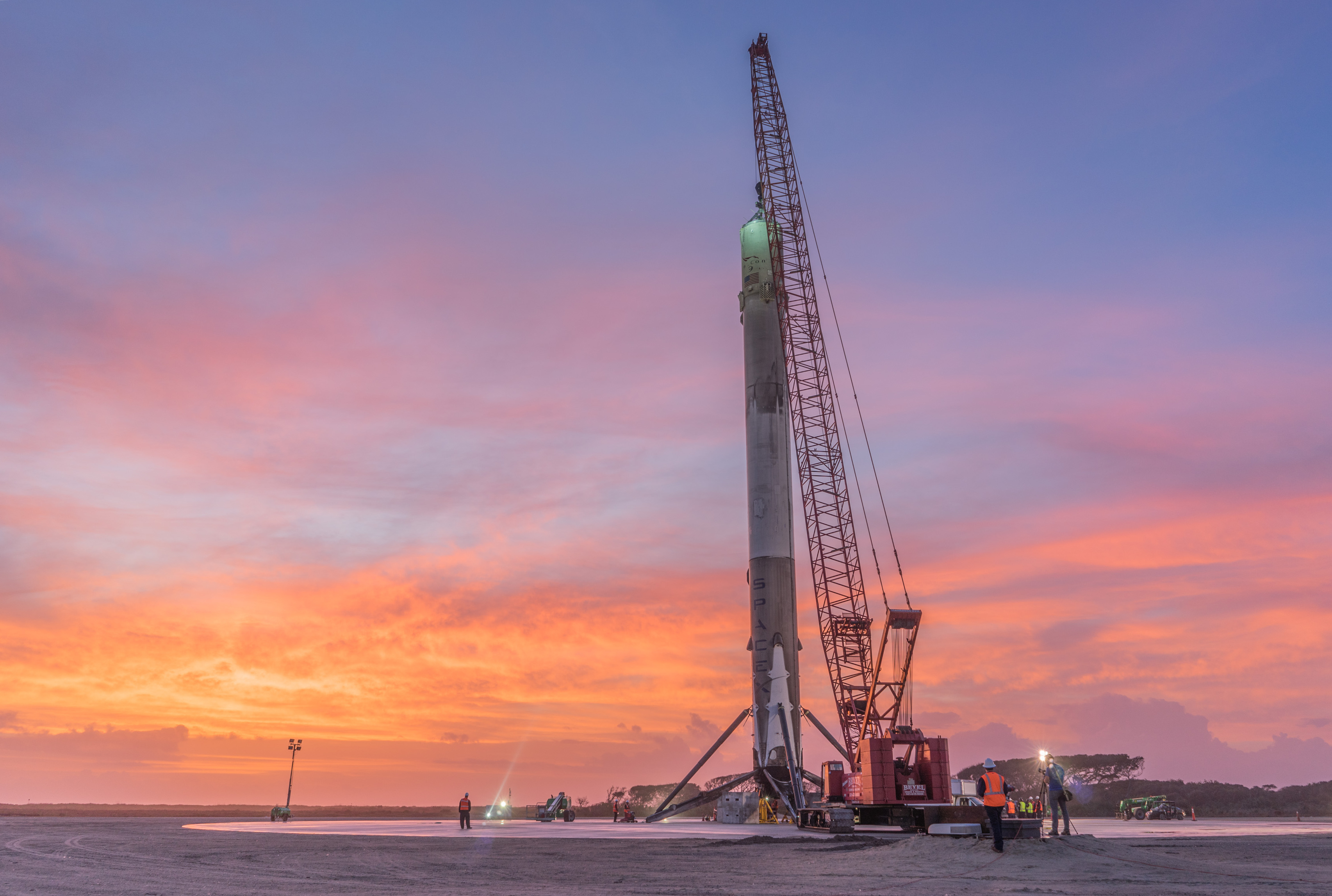
Recovery operations after Falcon 9 Flight 20 landing

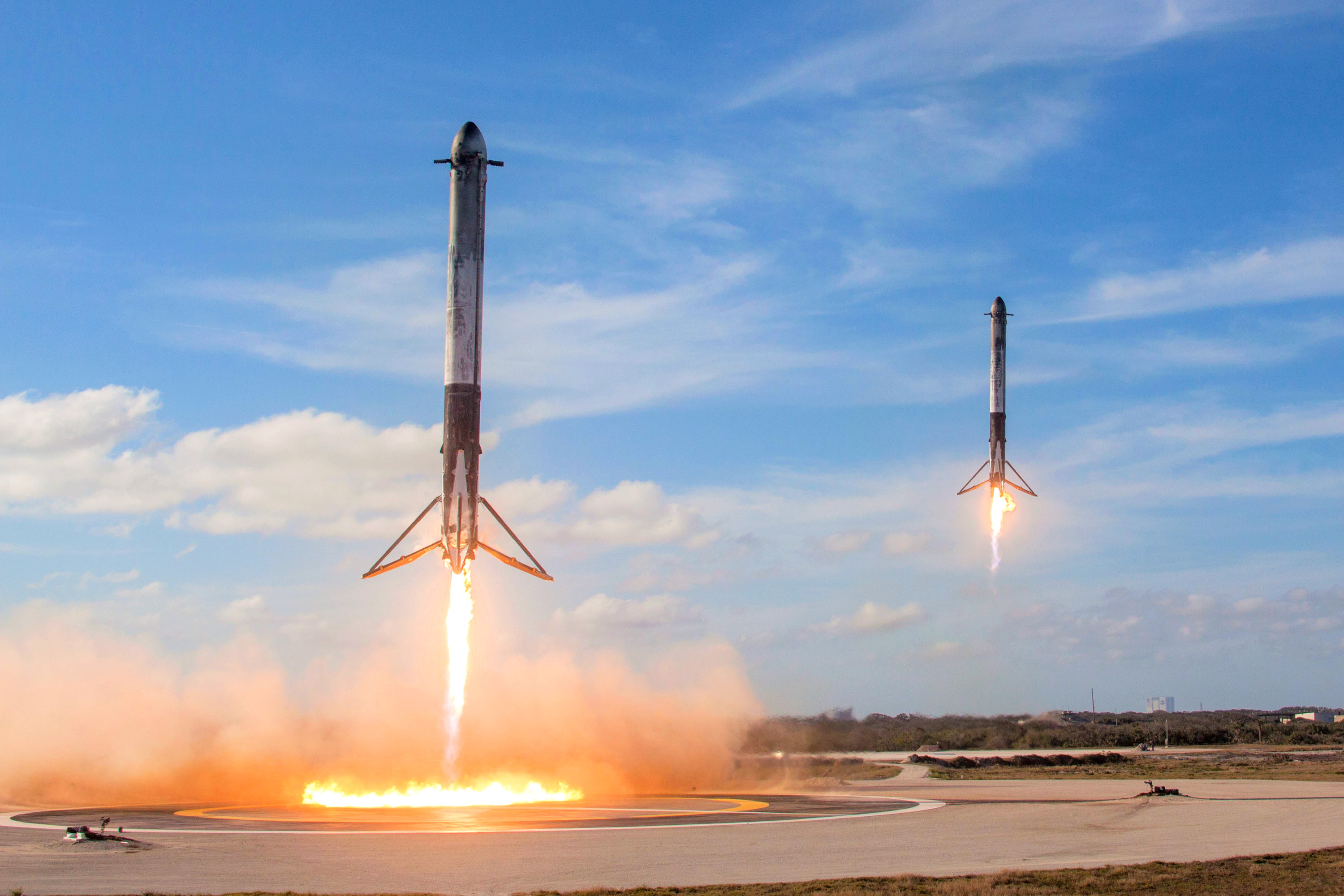
Falcon Heavy Side Boosters landing on LZ1 and LZ2 in 2018

Date (UTC)	Mission	Launch vehicle	Booster ID	Flight No.	Zone		Result	
December 22, 2015 01:39	OG2-F2	Falcon 9 Full Thrust	B1019-1	20	LZ-1		Success	
July 18, 2016 04:53	SpaceX CRS-9	Falcon 9 Full Thrust	B1025-1	27	LZ-1		Success	
February 19, 2017 14:47	SpaceX CRS-10	Falcon 9 Full Thrust	B1031-1	30	LZ-1		Success	
May 1, 2017 11:24	NROL-76	Falcon 9 Full Thrust	B1032-1	33	LZ-1		Success	
June 3, 2017 21:15	SpaceX CRS-11	Falcon 9 Full Thrust	B1035-1	35	LZ-1		Success	
August 14, 2017 16:39	SpaceX CRS-12	Falcon 9 Block 4	B1039-1	39	LZ-1		Success	
September 7, 2017	Boeing X-37B OTV-5	Falcon 9 Block 4	B1040-1	41	LZ-1		Success	
December 15, 2017	SpaceX CRS-13	Falcon 9 Full Thrust	B1035-2	45	LZ-1		Success	
January 8, 2018	Zuma	Falcon 9 Block 4	B1043-1	47	LZ-1		Success	
February 6, 2018	Elon Musk's Tesla Roadster	Falcon Heavy	B1023-2, B1025-2	FH #1	LZ-1; B1023-2	LZ-2; B1025-2	Success; B1023-2	Success; B1025-2
December 5, 2018	SpaceX CRS-16	Falcon 9 Block 5	B1050-1	65	LZ-1		Failure (Diverted to ocean)	
April 11, 2019	Arabsat-6A	Falcon Heavy	B1052-1, B1053-1	FH #2	LZ-1; B1052-1	LZ-2; B1053-1	Success; B1052-1	Success; B1053-1
June 25, 2019	STP-2	Falcon Heavy	B1052.2, B1053.2	FH #3	LZ-1; B1052-2	LZ-2; B1053-2	Success; B1052-2	Success; B1053-2
July 25, 2019	SpaceX CRS-18	Falcon 9 Block 5	B1056-2	73	LZ-1		Success	
March 7, 2020	SpaceX CRS-20	Falcon 9 Block 5	B1059-2	82	LZ-1		Success	
August 30, 2020	SAOCOM 1B	Falcon 9 Block 5	B1059-4	92	LZ-1		Success	
December 19, 2020	NROL-108	Falcon 9 Block 5	B1059-5	103	LZ-1		Success	
June 25, 2021	Transporter-2	Falcon 9 Block 5	B1060-8	123	LZ-1		Success	
January 13, 2022	Transporter-3	Falcon 9 Block 5	B1058-10	136	LZ-1		Success	
January 31, 2022	CSG-2	Falcon 9 Block 5	B1052-3	138	LZ-1		Success	
May 25, 2022	Transporter-5	Falcon 9 Block 5	B1061-8	156	LZ-1		Success	
November 1, 2022	USSF-44	Falcon Heavy	B1064-1, B1065-1	FH #4	LZ-1; B1064-1	LZ-2; B1065-1	Success; B1064-1	Success; B1065-1
December 8, 2022	OneWeb #15	Falcon 9 Block 5	B1069-4	188	LZ-1		Success	
December 11, 2022	Hakuto-R Mission 1 (including Transformable Lunar Robot and Emirates Lunar Mission); Lunar Flashlight	Falcon 9 Block 5	B1073-5	189	LZ-2		Success	
January 3, 2023	Transporter-6	Falcon 9 Block 5	B1060-15	195	LZ-1		Success	
January 10, 2023	OneWeb #16	Falcon 9 Block 5	B1076.2	196	LZ-1		Success	
January 15, 2023	USSF-67	Falcon Heavy	B1065-2, B1064-2	FH #5	LZ-1; B1065-2	LZ-2; B1064-2	Success; B1065-2	Success; B1064-2
March 9, 2023	OneWeb #17	Falcon 9 Block 5	B1062-13	209	LZ-1		Success	
May 21, 2023	Axiom Mission 2	Falcon 9 Block 5	B1080-1	226	LZ-1		Success	
July 29, 2023	EchoStar 24 (Jupiter 3)	Falcon Heavy	B1064-3, B1065-3	FH #7	LZ-1; B1064-3	LZ-2; B1065-3	Success; B1064-3	Success; B1065-3
August 26, 2023	SpaceX Crew-7	Falcon 9 Block 5	B1081.1	249	LZ-1		Success	
October 13, 2023	Psyche	Falcon Heavy	B1064-4, B1065-4	FH #8	LZ-1; B1064-4	LZ-2; B1065-4	Success; B1064-4	Success; B1065-4
November 10, 2023	SpaceX CRS-29	Falcon 9 Block 5	B1081-2	271	LZ-1		Success	
December 29, 2023	USSF-52 (Boeing X-37B OTV-7)	Falcon Heavy	B1064-5, B1065-5	FH #9	LZ-1; B1064-5	LZ-2; B1065-5	Success; B1064-5	Success; B1065-5
January 3, 2024	Ovzon-3	Falcon 9 Block 5	B1076-10	287	LZ-1		Success	
January 18, 2024	Axiom Mission 3	Falcon 9 Block 5	B1080-5	291	LZ-1		Success	
January 30, 2024	Cygnus NG-20	Falcon 9 Block 5	B1077-10	295	LZ-1		Success	
February 8, 2024	PACE	Falcon 9 Block 5	B1081-4	296	LZ-1		Success	
February 14, 2024	USSF-124	Falcon 9 Block 5	B1078-7	298	LZ-2		Success	
February 15, 2024	IM-1 Nova-C	Falcon 9 Block 5	B1060-18	299	LZ-1		Success	
March 4, 2024	SpaceX Crew-8	Falcon 9 Block 5	B1083-1	305	LZ-1		Success	
March 21, 2024	SpaceX CRS-30	Falcon 9 Block 5	B1080-6	312	LZ-1		Success	
April 7, 2024	Bandwagon-1	Falcon 9 Block 5	B1073-14	320	LZ-1		Success	
June 25, 2024	GOES-U	Falcon Heavy	B1072-1, B1086-1	FH #10	LZ-1; B1072-1	LZ-2; B1086-1	Success; B1072-1	Success; B1086-1
August 4, 2024	Cygnus NG-21	Falcon 9 Block 5	B1080-10	360	LZ-1		Success	
August 15, 2024	WorldView Legion 3 & 4	Falcon 9 Block 5	B1076-16	364	LZ-1		Success	
September 12, 2024	BlueBird Block 1 #1-5	Falcon 9 Block 5	B1078-13	373	LZ-1		Success	
September 28, 2024	SpaceX Crew-9	Falcon 9 Block 5	B1085-2	378	LZ-1		Success	
November 5, 2024	SpaceX CRS-31	Falcon 9 Block 5	B1083-5	389	LZ-1		Success	
November 11, 2024	Koreasat 6A	Falcon 9 Block 5	B1067-23	392	LZ-1		Success	
February 4, 2025	WorldView Legion 5 & 6	Falcon 9 Block 5	B1086-4	433	LZ-1		Success	
March 14, 2025	SpaceX Crew-10	Falcon 9 Block 5	B1090-2	446	LZ-1		Success	
March 24, 2025	NROL-69	Falcon 9 Block 5	B1092-2	451	LZ-1		Success	
April 21, 2025	SpaceX CRS-32	Falcon 9 Block 5	B1092-3	462	LZ-1		Success	
April 22, 2025	Bandwagon-3	Falcon 9 Block 5	B1090-3	463	LZ-2		Success	
June 25, 2025	Axiom Mission 4	Falcon 9 Block 5	B1094-2	495	LZ-1		Success	
August 1, 2025	SpaceX Crew-11	Falcon 9 Block 5	B1094-3	512	LZ-1		Success	
August 22, 2025	USSF-36 (Boeing X-37B OTV-8)	Falcon 9 Block 5	B1092-6	518	LZ-2		Success	
September 14, 2025	Cygnus NG-23	Falcon 9 Block 5	B1094-4	533	LZ-2		Success	
November 2, 2025	Bandwagon-4	Falcon 9 Block 5	B1091-3	557	LZ-2		Success	
December 9, 2025	NROL-77	Falcon 9 Block 5	B1096-4	576	LZ-2		Success	
April 29, 2026	ViaSat-3 F3	Falcon Heavy	B1072-2	FH #12	LZ-2		Success	
July 30, 2026	NROL-95	Falcon 9 Block 5	B1096-7	670	LZ-2		Success	
August 30, 2026	Nancy Grace Roman Space Telescope	Falcon Heavy	B1072-3	FH #13	LZ-2		Success	
October 2, 2026	NROL-97	Falcon Heavy	B1104-2, B1072-4	FH #14	LZ-1; B1104-2	LZ-2; B1072-4	Success; B1104-2 (Last LZ-1 landing)	Success; B1072-4

== See also ==
- SpaceX reusable launch system development program
- Autonomous spaceport drone ship, used to recover first stage boosters at sea
