= SpaceX CRS-9 =

2016 American resupply spaceflight to the ISS

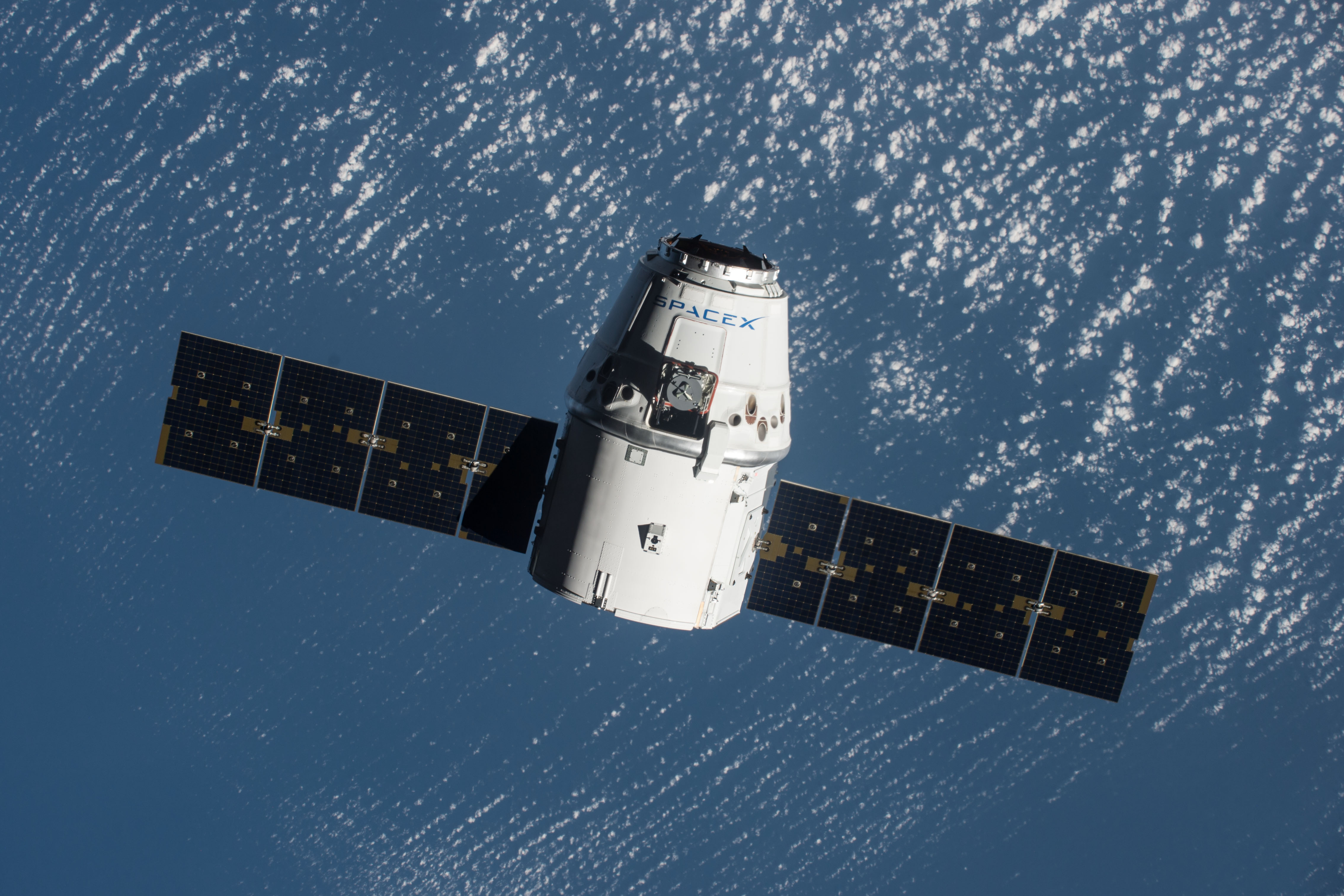
- SpaceX Dragon during approach to ISS
- Names: SpX-9
- Mission type: ISS resupply
- Operator: SpaceX
- COSPAR ID: 2016-046A
- SATCAT no.: 41672
- Mission duration: 39 days, 11 hours, 3 minutes

Spacecraft properties
- Spacecraft: Dragon 1 C111
- Spacecraft type: Dragon 1
- Manufacturer: SpaceX
- Dry mass: 4,200 kg (9,300 lb)
- Dimensions: Height: 6.1 m (20 ft); Diameter: 3.7 m (12 ft)

Start of mission
- Launch date: 18 July 2016, 04:44 UTC
- Rocket: Falcon 9 Full Thrust (B1025)
- Launch site: Cape Canaveral, SLC-40
- Contractor: SpaceX

End of mission
- Disposal: Recovered
- Landing date: 26 August 2016, 15:47 UTC
- Landing site: Pacific Ocean, 525 km (326 mi) SW of Baja

Orbital parameters
- Reference system: Geocentric
- Regime: Low Earth
- Semi-major axis: 6,780.61 km (4,213.28 mi)
- Eccentricity: 0.000214
- Perigee altitude: 401.02 km (249.18 mi)
- Apogee altitude: 403.93 km (250.99 mi)
- Inclination: 51.6432°
- Period: 92.62 minutes
- Mean motion: 15.5488 rev/day
- Epoch: 25 July 2016, 12:53:58 UTC

Berthing at ISS
- Berthing port: Harmony nadir
- RMS capture: 20 July 2016, 10:56 UTC
- Berthing date: 20 July 2016, 14:03 UTC
- Unberthing date: 25 August 2016, 21:00 UTC
- RMS release: 26 August 2016, 10:11 UTC
- Time berthed: 36 days, 6 hours, 57 minutes

Cargo
- Mass: 2,257 kg (4,975.8 lb)
- Pressurised: 1,790 kg (3,946.3 lb)
- Unpressurised: 467 kg (1,029.5 lb)
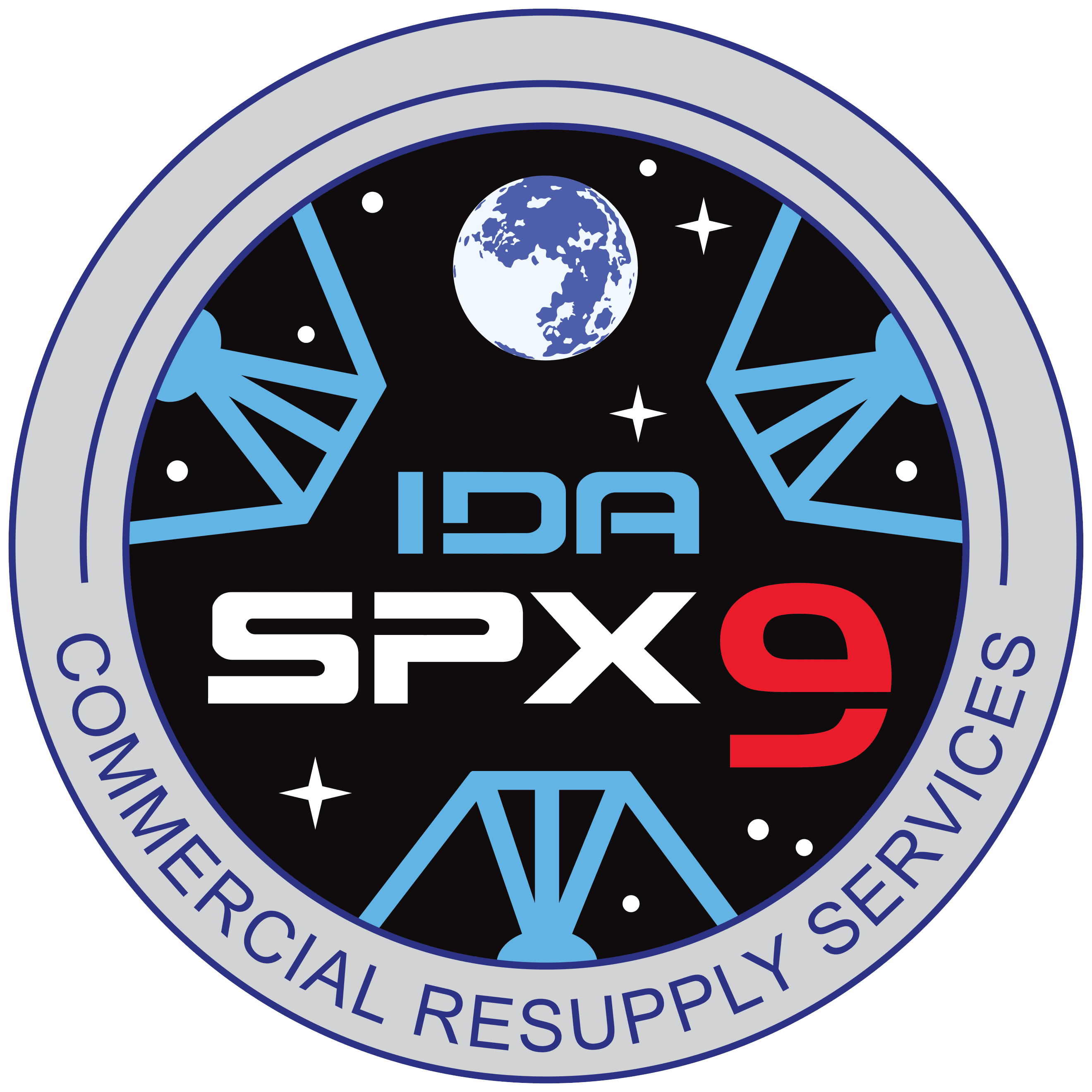
- NASA SpX-9 mission patch Commercial Resupply Services Cargo Dragon

SpaceX CRS-9, also known as SpX-9, was a Commercial Resupply Service mission to the International Space Station which launched on 18 July 2016. The mission was contracted by NASA and was operated by SpaceX using a Dragon capsule.

The cargo was successfully carried aboard SpaceX's Falcon 9 Flight 27.

== Launch and operations history ==
A July 2014 NASA Flight Planning Integration Panel (FPIP) presentation had this mission scheduled no earlier than (NET) 7 December 2015. By December 2014, the launch had been pushed back to NET 9 December 2015. Following the failure of SpaceX CRS-7 on 28 June 2015, the launch date was left open and, in September 2015, was moved to NET 21 March 2016. The flight was later pushed to 24 June, 27 June, 16 July, and finally 18 July 2016, as the crewed mission Soyuz MS-01 took the 24 June slot.

CRS-9 launched on 18 July 2016 at 04:44 UTC from Cape Canaveral SLC-40 aboard a Falcon 9 launch vehicle. After 9 minutes and 37 seconds the Dragon spacecraft successfully separated from the rocket, and deployed its solar arrays about two minutes later. The opening of its GNC door came two hours later, enabling orbital operations.

After a series or orbital maneuvers and stationkeeping at different hold points, the CRS-9 Dragon was captured by the ISS's Canadarm2 on 20 July 2016 at 10:56 UTC. After robotic operations, it was berthed some three hours later at 14:03 UTC.

In preparation for recovery, the Dragon capsule was loaded with 1,550 kg (3,410 lb) of experiments and no-longer-needed equipment and, on 25 August 2016 at 21:00 UTC, it was unberthed and stowed in an overnight parking position away from the station. Dragon was released from Canadarm2 the following day at 10:11 UTC. After maneuvering away from the station, Dragon conducted a re-entry burn at 14:56 UTC and successfully landed in the Pacific Ocean at 15:47 UTC, approximately 525 km (326 mi) southwest of Baja California.

== Primary payload ==
NASA contracted for the CRS-9 mission from SpaceX and therefore determined the primary payload, date/time of launch, and orbital parameters for the Dragon space capsule.

CRS-9 carried 2,257 kilograms (4,975.8 lb) of cargo to the International Space Station. Amongst its pressurized cargo was 930 kg (2,050.3 lb) of material supporting about 250 science and research experiments, 370 kg (815.7 lb) of crew supplies, 280 kg (617.3 lb) of spacecraft hardware, 127 kg (279.9 lb) of extravehicular activity equipment, 1 kg (2.2 lb) of computer equipment, and 54 kg (119.1 lb) of Russian hardware. Its unpressurized cargo, the International Docking Adapter-2 located in Dragon's trunk, massed 467 kg (1,029.5 lb).

Some of the key experiments transported by CRS-9 to the ISS were the Biomolecule Sequencer, which performed DNA sequencing in orbit; the Phase Change Heat Exchanger, which tested temperature regulation systems for future spacecraft applications; the OsteoOmics experiment, which tested if Earth-based magnetic levitation can properly simulate microgravity conditions; and the Heart Cells experiment from Stanford University, which examined the effects of microgravity on the human heart at the cellular and molecular level using human induced pluripotent stem cell-derived cardiomyocytes.

== First stage landing ==
Following stage separation, the rocket's first stage performed a boostback maneuver and landed smoothly at Landing Zone 1, Cape Canaveral, for the second time on solid ground, following Falcon 9 Flight 20 in December 2015.

== Gallery ==
SpaceX CRS-6
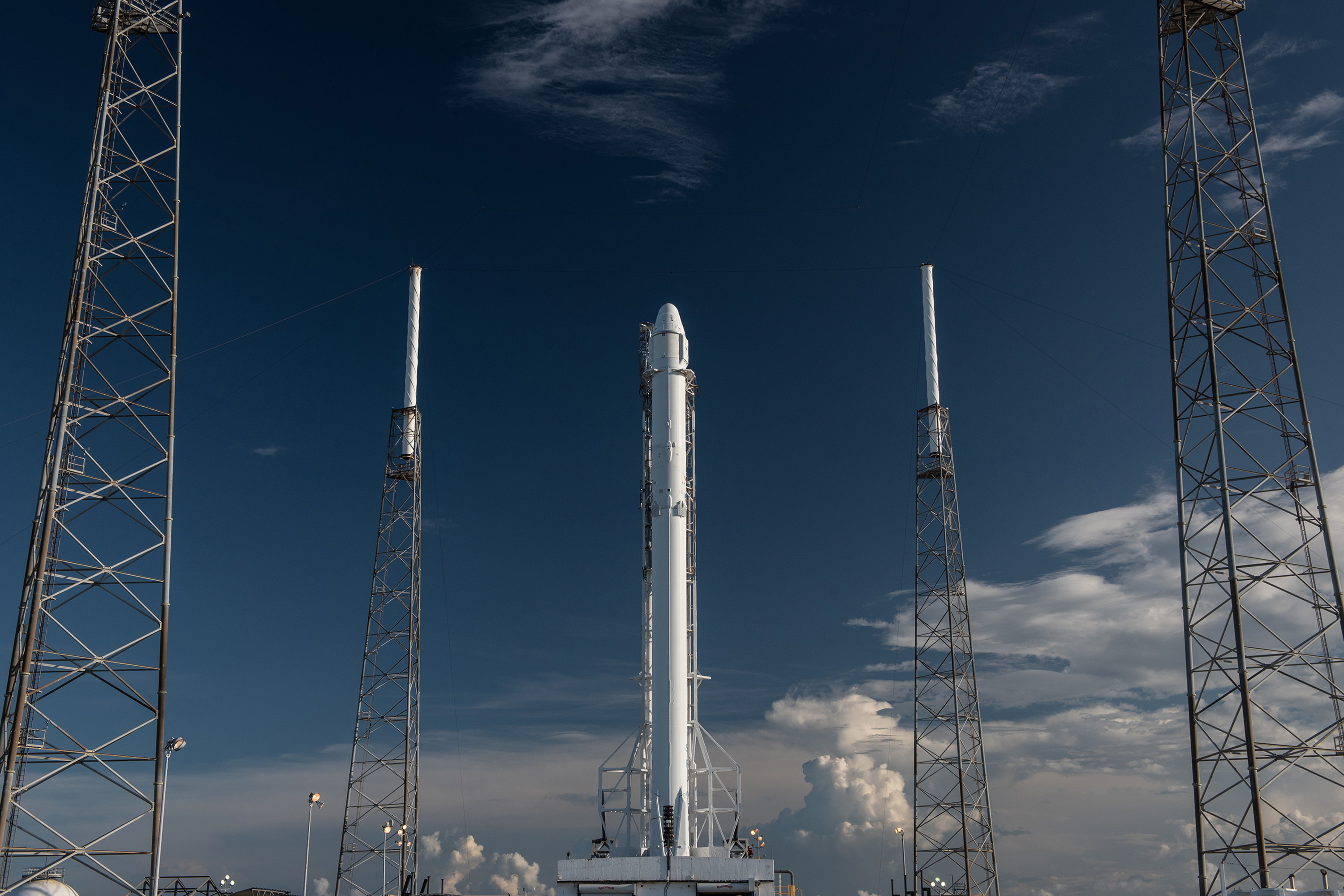
CRS-9 before launch

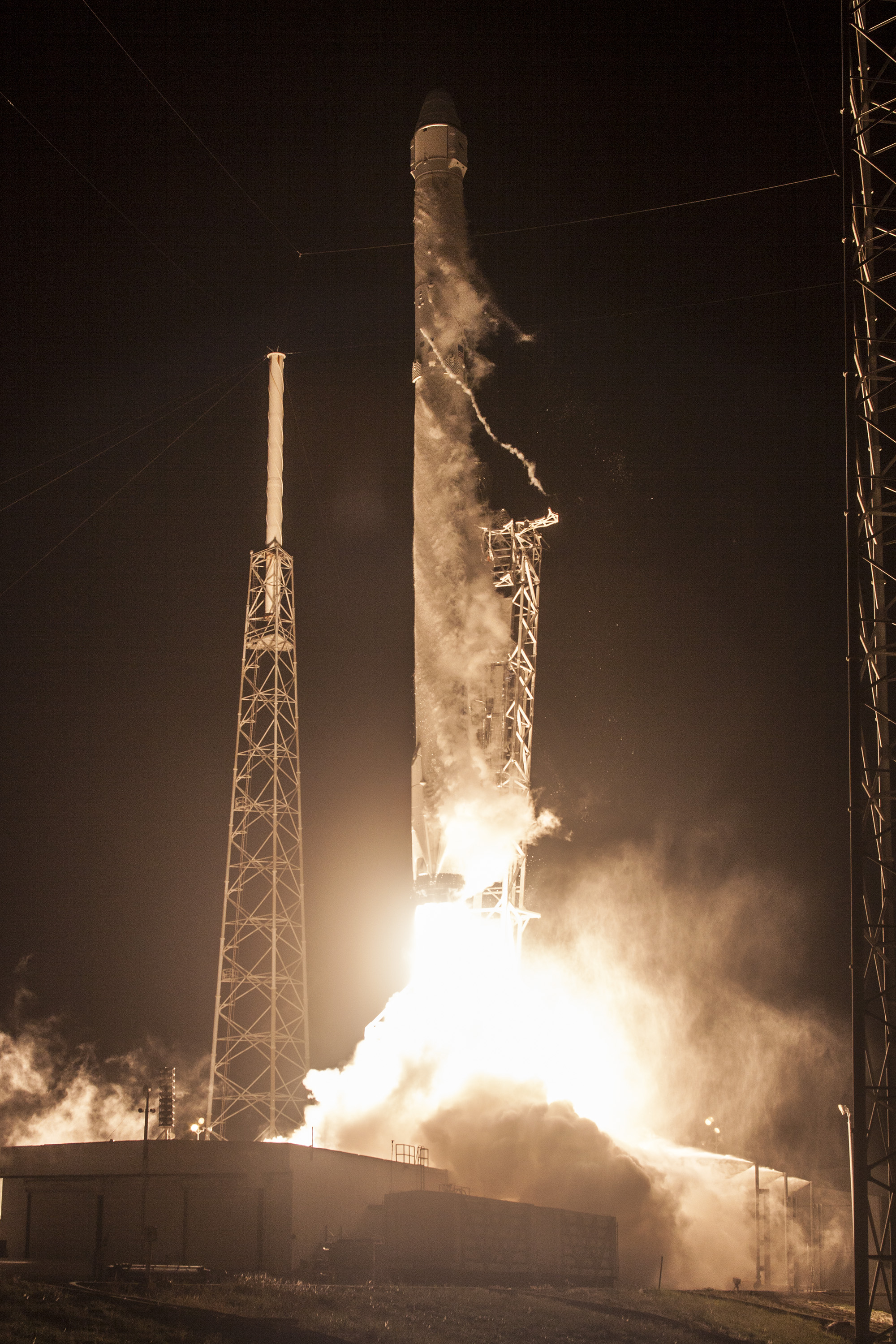
Launch of CRS-9

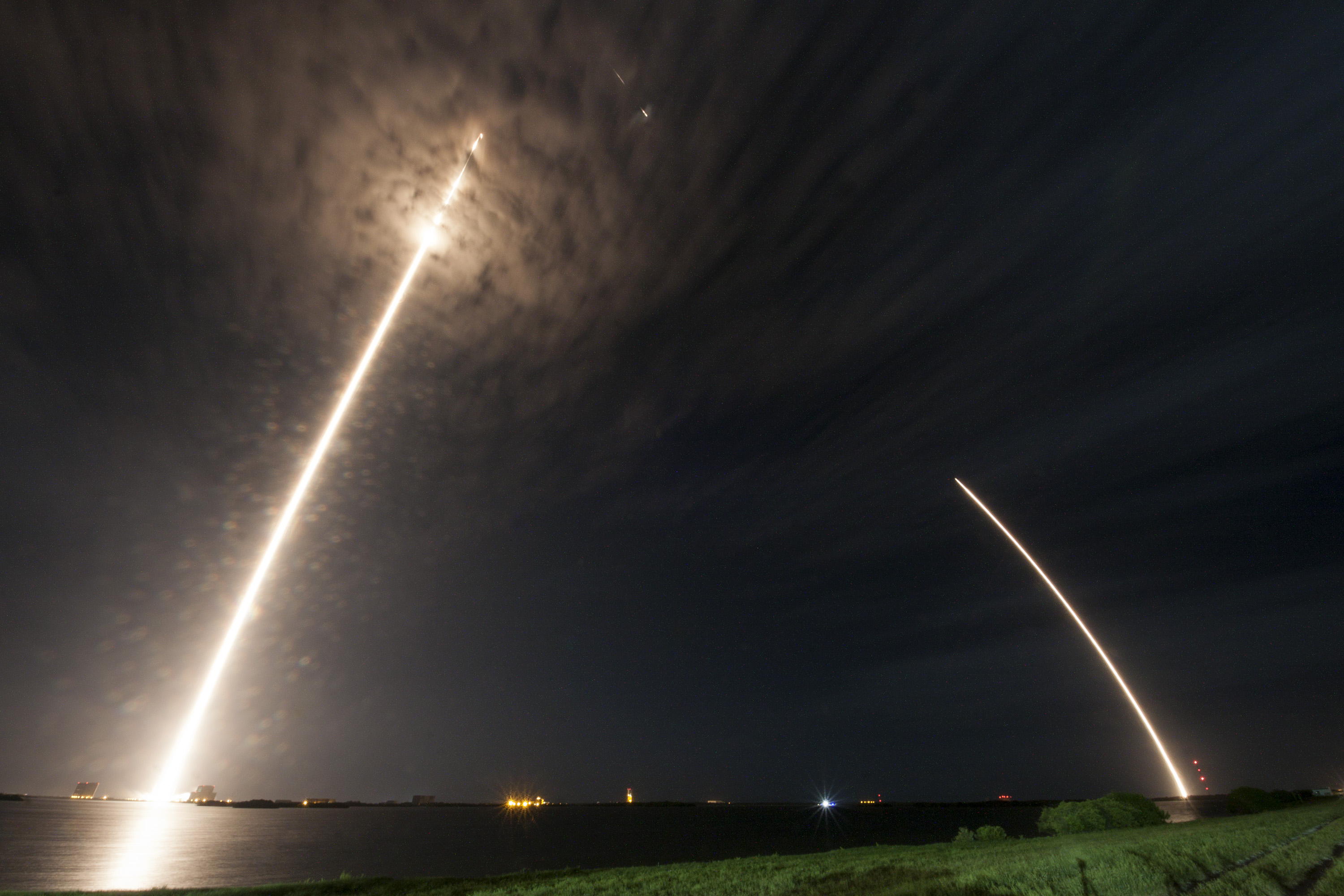
Long exposure image of launch and landing

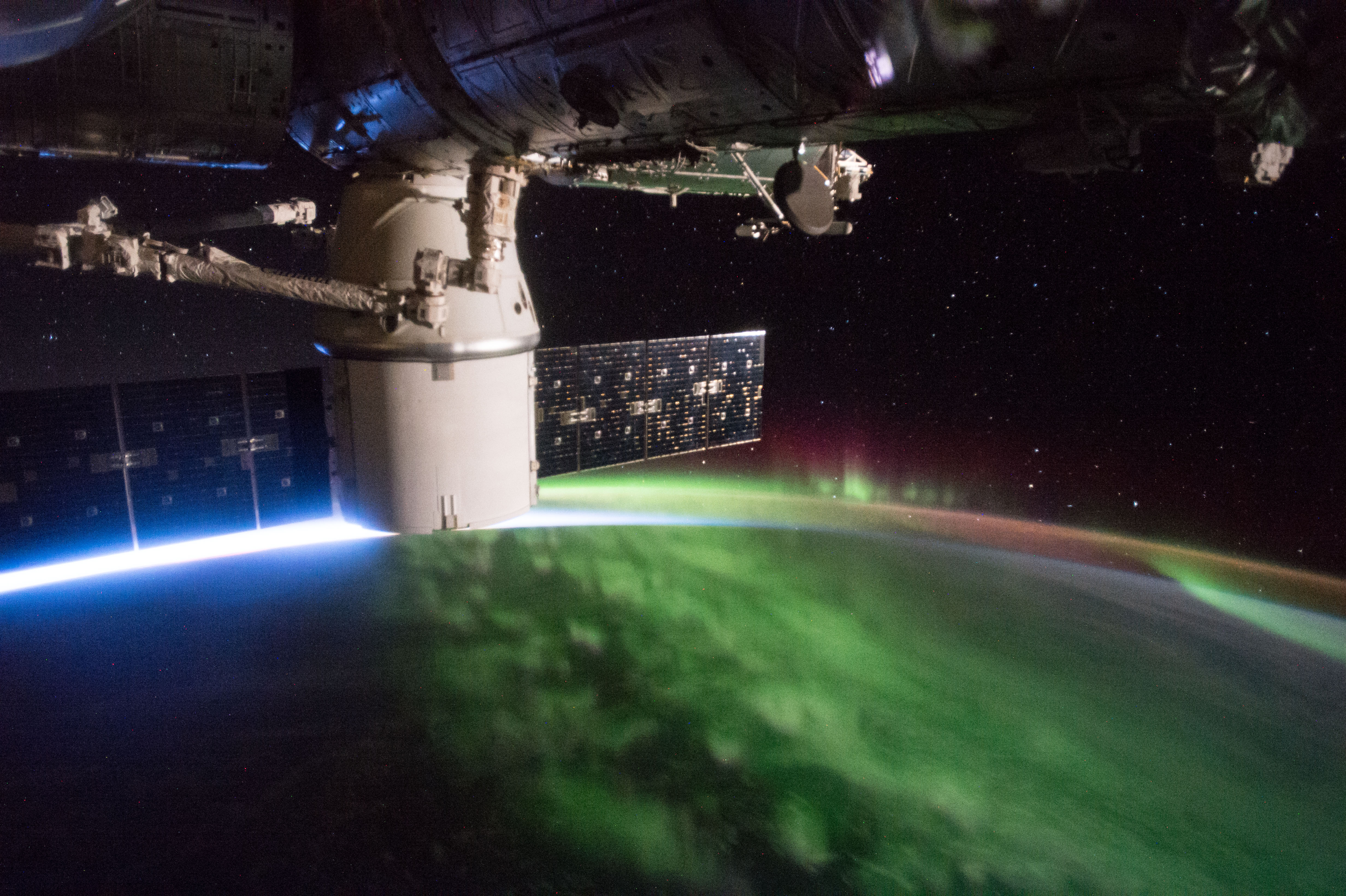
Dragon docked to the ISS

== See also ==
- List of Falcon 9 launches
