= Falcon 9 flight 20 =

Falcon 9 space launch that occurred on 22 December 2015 at 01:29:00 UTC

- Official patch for Orbcomm-OG2 mission

Falcon 9 Full Thrust launch
- Launch: 22 December 2015; 10 years ago, 01:29:00 UTC
- Operator: SpaceX
- Pad: Cape Canaveral, SLC-40
- Payload: Orbcomm-OG2 × 11
- Outcome: Success

Components
- First stage: B1019.1

Falcon launches

Falcon 9 flight 20 (also known as Orbcomm OG2 M2) was a Falcon 9 space launch that occurred on 22 December 2015 at 01:29:00 UTC (21 December, 8:29:00 pm local time). It was the first time that the first stage of an orbital rocket made a successful return and vertical landing.

The successful landing of the first stage at Landing Zone 1, near the launch site, was the result of a five-year technology development program to develop a reusable launch system and came on a flight test that followed the primary launch mission. Following separation of the second stage, SpaceX conducted the eighth of its controlled booster descent tests of the spent first stage, the first in which the descent target location was on land, and also the first ever successful landing.

Prior to this flight, SpaceX's two previous attempts at a vertical landing and booster recovery ended in failure to recover the rocket. The success of flight 20 marked a significant milestone en route to the company's goal of creating a reusable rocket system that would significantly reduce the cost of launching payloads into orbit.

Falcon 9 flight 20 was the first launch of the substantially upgraded Falcon 9 Full Thrust version of the Falcon 9 launch vehicle. It carried 11 Orbcomm-OG2 satellites to Earth orbit. The launch was also notable as it was the first SpaceX launch following the catastrophic failure of a Falcon 9 v1.1 launch vehicle's second stage on Falcon 9 Flight 19 in June 2015.

== Launch schedule history ==
SES announced in February 2015 that it would provide the payload on the first launch of the revised-design Falcon 9 Full Thrust (also called Falcon 9 v1.2). At the time, SES expected its SES-9 geostationary communications satellite would launch by September 2015. SES kept the decision despite the loss of the launch vehicle and payload of another SpaceX mission in June 2015, but postponed the launch until late 2015.

On 16 October 2015, after considering all options, SpaceX announced a change: Orbcomm's 11 OG2 satellites would be the payload on the return-to-flight launch of the redesigned Falcon 9 instead of SES-9. The Orbcomm payload with its lower orbit would allow SpaceX to test relighting the second-stage engine, a capability required to successfully put the heavier SES-9 on a geostationary orbit. The launch was delayed to mid-December or later, while SES-9 was scheduled to follow within a few weeks.

A required pre-launch static-fire test was initially scheduled for 16 December 2015, but a few issues emerged with the new processes required for the colder propellants for the launch vehicle and the related ground support equipment. The test was successfully carried out on 18 December 2015, which resulted in a launch delay of one day to 19 December 2015 (local time). The launch was subsequently delayed an additional day after statistical analysis indicated a somewhat higher probability of recovering the booster on the later date.

== New launch vehicle ==
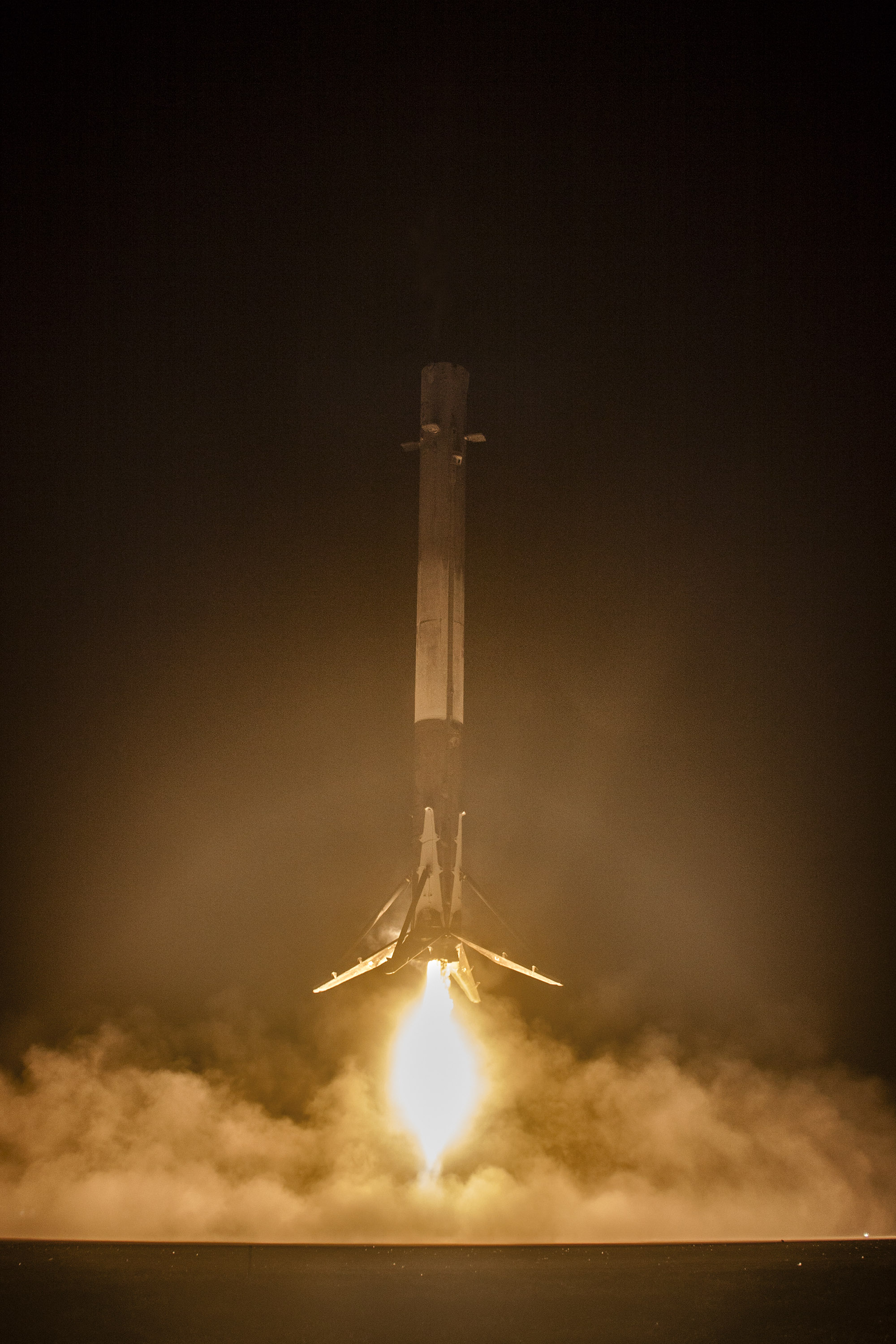
First stage of Falcon 9 flight 20 landing on a ground pad in December 2015

The Falcon 9 Full Thrust launch vehicle used on flight 20 had a number of significant modifications from the previous Falcon 9 v1.1 vehicle. These included:

- increased second stage tank length and propellant volume
- larger Merlin 1D vacuum engine nozzle
- larger and stronger interstage with revised stage-separation mechanism
- revised grid fin design to support the continuation of the Falcon 9 booster controlled-descent and landing tests, and ultimately, the operational Reusable Falcon 9 launch system
- upgraded structure in the landing legs, also to support the reusable development program and objectives
- upgraded first stage structure and octaweb engine support structure
- denser liquid oxygen and RP-1 propellants through the use of subcooling, refrigeration below the typical temperature of previous Falcon 9 launch conditions.
- first stage booster can reach low Earth orbit as a single stage if not carrying the upper stage and a heavy satellite.

== Launch and on-orbit test ==
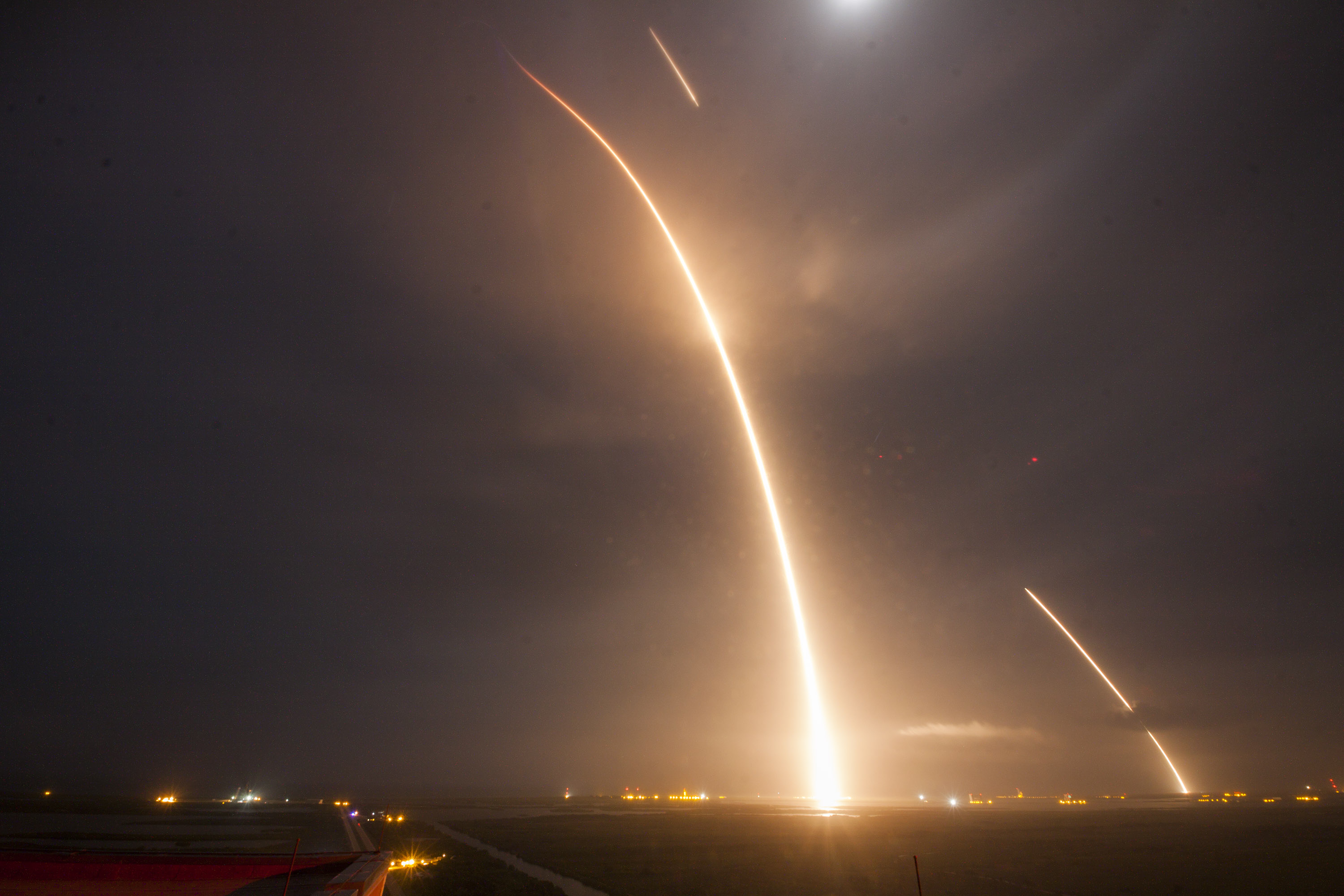
Long-exposure of launch (left) and landing (right) during the flight.

Flight 20 was launched on 22 December 2015 at 01:29 UTC (21 December, 8:29 pm local time).

=== Second stage re-ignition ===
Following successful launch and deployment of the OG2 satellites, the Merlin Vacuum (1D) second-stage engine successfully re-ignited, demonstrating its capability to launch SES-9 into geostationary transfer orbit. The engine burn de-orbited the second stage as planned for a destructive re-entry, preventing it from becoming space debris.

== Payload ==
Falcon 9 Flight 20 carried 11 Orbcomm-OG2 second-generation satellites, which will provide enhanced ORBCOMM messaging capabilities, increased data capacity, and automatic identification systems (AIS) service. All 11 satellites were successfully deployed by the Falcon 9 second stage, beginning approximately 14 minutes after takeoff. All 11 satellites successfully checked in with ground control stations.

The satellites were placed by the launch vehicle "within a fraction of a degree in inclination and 5 km (3.1 mi) in altitude of the intended orbit, "and by 9 January 2016, were in the middle of on-orbit testing, while executing propulsion maneuvers that had spread the 11 satellites over a 6,400 km (4,000 mi) orbital arc. Initial ORBCOMM customer message traffic began to be tested by late January 2016.

Satflare reported in February 2016 that one of the 11 flight 2 satellites will reenter Earth's atmosphere in late-February 2016.

The satellite manufacturer, Sierra Nevada Corporation, completed checkout work and handed all 11 satellites off to ORBCOMM in early March 2016.

== Post-mission landing ==
SpaceX performed a controlled-descent test on the rocket's first stage — the eighth propulsive return test of the series. For the first time, SpaceX was able to vertically land and successfully recover the first stage. Earlier tests had proven the high-altitude deceleration and atmospheric re-entry portions of the test protocol, but no landing attempt had previously been successful, including two attempts earlier in 2015 to land a first stage on a floating landing platform. The entire controlled-descent through the atmosphere and landing attempt is an arrangement that is unusual for other launch vehicles.

The flight test was planned for the twentieth Falcon 9 launch, even after the manifested payload was switched from SES-9 to the 11-satellite Orbcomm OG-2 payload. The test was scheduled for and successfully carried out on 21 December 2015, when the first stage landed intact at Landing Zone 1.

SpaceX decided not to fly the B1019 again. Rather, the rocket was moved a few miles north to Launch Pad 39A, recently refurbished by SpaceX at the adjacent Kennedy Space Center, to conduct a static fire test. This test aimed to assess the health of the recovered booster and the capability of this rocket design to fly repeatedly in the future. The historic booster was eventually displayed outside SpaceX headquarters in Hawthorne, California.

=== Evaluation of the recovered first stage ===
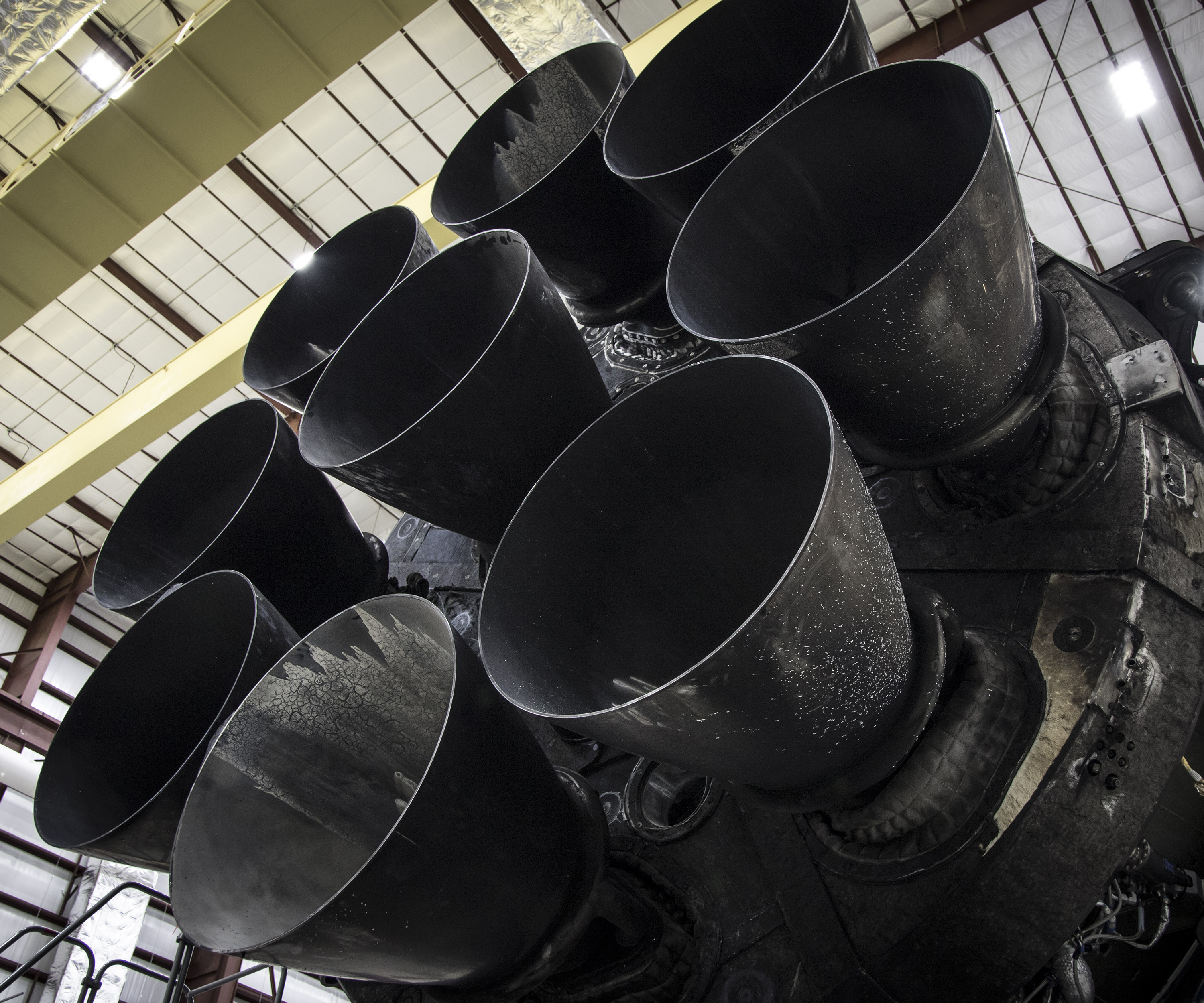
Falcon 9 used first stage engine

On 31 December 2015, SpaceX announced that no damage had been found on the stage and that it was ready to perform a static fire again. SpaceX had initially moved the booster to their hangar at LC-39A, but they moved the stage to SLC-40 — the pad from which it was launched — on 12 January 2016. On 15 January 2016, SpaceX conducted the static fire test on the recovered booster, obtaining good overall results except for one of the outer engines experiencing thrust fluctuations. Elon Musk reported that this may have been due to debris ingestion.

In February 2016, SpaceX President and COO Gwynne Shotwell indicated that some unspecified modifications to the stage design would occur as a result of the booster's post-flight evaluation and static fire.

== Display ==
In August 2016, the returned first stage was put on permanent display on a stand outside SpaceX headquarters in Hawthorne, California.

== Live coverage ==
SpaceX live coverage of the launch and landing included cheering crowds and tours of the SpaceX manufacturing and launch facilities. The Atlantic technology editor Robinson Meyer called the scripted broadcast "a way of treating a rocket launch not like a dry engineering procedure, but like some combination of the Macy's Thanksgiving Day Parade and the Super Bowl". Upon the unprecedented first stage landing, a SpaceX engineer announced "The Falcon has landed", reminding audiences of the first Apollo landing.

== See also ==
- List of Falcon 9 and Falcon Heavy launches
- VTVL
