= List of Delta 1 launches =

Here is a list of the delta rockets (from thor to delta version)

== About the Delta 1 rockets ==
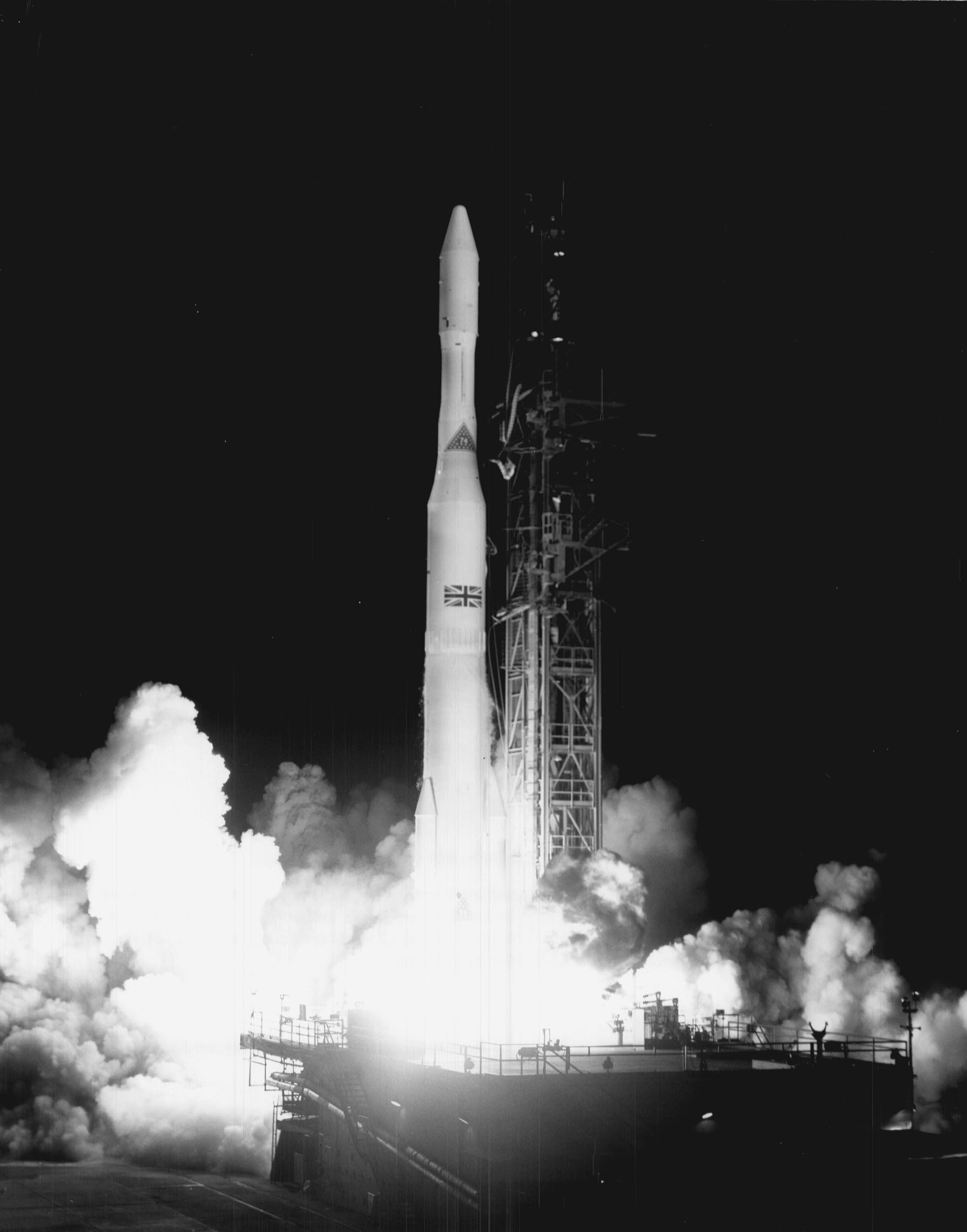
Launch of the first Skynet satellite by Delta M launch vehicle in 1969 from Cape Canaveral

=== Delta A ===
The Delta A used the MB-3 Block II engine, with 170,000 lbf (760 kN) of thrust versus 152,000 lbf (680 kN) for the Block I.

13. 2 October 1962 – Explorer 14 (EPE-B).
14. 27 October 1962 – Explorer 15 (EPE-C).

=== Delta B ===
The Delta B introduced the upgraded AJ10-118D upper stage, a three-foot propellant tank extension, higher-energy oxidizer, and solid-state guidance system. With the Delta B the Delta program went from "interim" to "operational" status. Delta B could launch 200 lb (91 kg) to GTO.

15. 13 December 1962. Relay 1, second NASA communications satellite, the NASA communications satellite first active one.
16. 13 February 1963. Pad 17B. Syncom 1; Thiokol Corporation Star-13B solid rocket as apogee motor.
20. 26 July 1963. Syncom 2; geosynchronous orbit, but inclined 33.0° due to the limited performance of the Delta rocket.

=== Delta C ===
For Delta C, the third stage Altair was replaced with Altair 2. The Altair 2 had been developed as the ABL X-258 for the Scout vehicle and was 3 in (76 mm) longer, 10% heavier, and with 65% more total thrust. OSO 4 is an example of a Delta C launch.

=== Delta D ===
Delta D, also known as Thrust Augmented Delta, was a Delta C with the Thrust Augmented Thor core plus three Castor 1 boosters.

25. 19 August 1964. Syncom 3, the first geostationary communications satellite.
30. 6 April 1965. Intelsat I.

=== Delta E ===
First Delta E: 6 November 1965; launched GEOS 1

=== Delta F ===
This launch vehicle was not built.

=== Delta G ===
The Delta G was a Delta E without the third stage. The two-stage vehicle was used for two launches: Biosatellite 1 on 14 December 1966 and Biosatellite 2 on 7 September 1967.

=== Delta J ===
The Delta J used a larger Thiokol Star 37D motor as the third stage and was launched once on 4 July 1968 with Explorer 38.

=== Delta K ===
This launch vehicle was not built.

=== Delta L ===
The Delta L introduced the Extended Long Tank first stage with a uniform 2.4 m (7 ft 10 in) diameter and used the United Technologies FW-4D motor as a third stage.

=== Delta M ===
The Delta M first stage consisted of a Long Tank Thor with MB-3-3 engine augmented with three Castor 2 boosters. The Delta E was the second stage, with a Star 37D (Burner 2) third stage/apogee kick motor. There were 12 successful Delta M launches from 1968 until 1971.

=== Delta N ===
The Delta N combined a Long Tank Thor (MB-3-3 engine) first stage augmented with three Castor 2 boosters and a Delta E second stage. There were six successful Delta N launches from 1968 until 1972.

=== "Super Six" ===
The "Super Six" was a Delta M or Delta N with three additional Castor 2 boosters for a total of six, which was the maximum that could be accommodated. These were respectively designated Delta M6 or Delta N6. The first and only launch of the M6 configuration was Explorer 43 (IMP-H, Magnetospheric research) on 13 March 1971. Three launches of the N6 between 1970 and 1971 resulted in one failure.

- 450 kg (990 lb) to GTO

=== Delta 0100-series ===
The Delta 0100 series was the first stage of the initial numbered Delta was the Long Tank Thor, a version of the Thor missile with extended propellant tanks. Up to nine strap-on solid rocket boosters (SRBs) could be fitted. With three SRBs, the Delta was designated a 300 series, while the nine SRB variant was designated the 900 series. A new and improved Delta F second stage using the higher-thrust Aerojet AJ 10-118F engine was also introduced. The first 900 series launch was the fourth Delta 0100. On 23 July 1972, Thor-Delta 904 launched Landsat 1. A license-built version of the Long Tank Thor stage with the MB-3 engine was also used for the Japanese N-I launch vehicle.

=== Delta 1000-series ===
The Delta 1000 series was nicknamed the Straight-Eight and combined an Extended Long Tank first stage with an 8 ft-diameter (2.4 m) payload fairing, up to nine Castor 2 SRBs, and the new McDonnell Douglas Delta P second stage using the TRW TR-201 engine. Payload capacity increased to 1,835 kg (4,045 lb) to LEO or 635 kg (1,400 lb) to GTO. The first successful 1000 series Thor-Delta launched Explorer 47 on 22 September 1972. The Extended Long Tank Thor stage was also used in the Japanese N-II and H-I launch vehicles.

=== Delta 2000-series ===
The Delta 2000 introduced the new Rocketdyne RS-27 main engine on an Extended Long Tank first stage with the same constant 8-foot diameter. A Delta 2310 was the vehicle for the first three-satellite launch of NOAA-4, Intasat, and AMSAT-OSCAR 7 on 15 November 1974. Delta 2910 boosters were used to launch both Landsat 2 in 1975 and Landsat 3 in 1978. On 7 April 1978, a Delta 2914 launched "Yuri 1", the first Japanese BSE Broadcasting Satellite.

=== Delta 3000-series ===
The Delta 3000 combined the same first stage as 1000-series and 2000-series with upgraded Castor 4 solid boosters and was the last Delta series to use the McDonnell Douglas Delta P second stage with TRW TR-201 engine. Delta 3000 introduced the PAM (Payload Assist Module) / Star 48B solid-fueled kick motor, which was later used as Delta II third stage. The Delta 3914 model was approved for launching United States government payloads in May 1976 and was launched 13 times between 1975 and 1987.

=== Delta 4000-series ===
The Delta 4000-series and 5000-series were developed in the aftermath of the Challenger disaster and consisted of a combination of 3000-era and Delta II-era components. The first stage had the MB-3 main engine and Extended Long Tank of the 3000-series and mounted upgraded Castor 4A motors. The new Delta K second stage was also included. A total of three were launched in 1989 and 1990, carrying two operational payloads.

=== Delta 5000-series ===
The Delta 5000 series featured upgraded Castor 4A motors on an Extended Long Tank first stage with the new RS-27 main engine and only launched one mission.

== Launch statistics ==
=== Launch outcome ===
- Failure
- Partial Failure
- Success

Statistics are up-to-date as of 27 July 2021.

== Launch history ==
Number	Date/time (UTC)	Rocket	S/N	Launch site	Payload	Function	Orbit	Outcome	Remarks
1	1962-10-02; 22:11:30	Delta A	Thor 345; Delta 13	CCAFS LC-17B	Explorer 14	Magnetospheric	HEO	Success	Maiden flight of Delta A
2	1962-10-27; 23:15:01	Delta A	Thor 346; Delta 14	CCAFS LC-17B	Explorer 15	Radiation	MEO	Success	Final flight of Delta A
3	1962-12-13; 23:30:01	Delta B	Thor 355; Delta 15	CCAFS LC-17A	Relay 1	Communications	MEO	Success	Maiden flight of Delta B
4	1963-02-14; 05:35:08	Delta B	Thor 358; Delta 16	CCAFS LC-17B	Syncom 1	Communications	GTO	Success	Electronics failure on payload
5	1963-04-03; 02:00:02	Delta B	Thor 357; Delta 17	CCAFS LC-17A	Explorer 17	Atmospheric	LEO	Success	
6	1963-05-07; 11:38:03	Delta B	Thor 366; Delta 18	CCAFS LC-17B	Telstar 2	Communications	MEO	Success	
7	1963-06-19; 09:50:01	Delta B	Thor 359; Delta 19	CCAFS LC-17B	TIROS-7	Weather	SSO	Success	
8	1963-07-26; 14:33:00	Delta B	Thor 370; Delta 20	CCAFS LC-17A	Syncom 2	Communications	GTO	Success	
9	1963-11-27; 02:30:01	Delta C	Thor 387; Delta 21	CCAFS LC-17B	Explorer 18	Magnetospheric	HEO	Success	Maiden flight of Delta C
10	1963-12-21; 09:30:00	Delta B	Thor 371; Delta 22	CCAFS LC-17B	TIROS-8	Weather	SSO	Success	
11	1964-01-21; 21:14:59	Delta B	Thor 373; Delta 23	CCAFS LC-17B	Relay 2	Communications	MEO	Success	
12	1964-03-19; 11:13:41	Delta B	Thor 391; Delta 24	CCAFS LC-17A	BE-A	Ionospheric	LEO	Failure	Third stage underperformed
13	1964-08-19; 12:15:02	Delta D	Thor 417; Delta 25	CCAFS LC-17A	Syncom 3	Communications	GTO	Success	
14	1964-10-04; 03:45:00	Delta C	Thor 392; Delta 26	CCAFS LC-17A	Explorer 21	Magnetospheric	HEO	Partial failure	Reached lower than planned orbit
15	1964-12-21; 09:00:03	Delta C	Thor 393; Delta 27	CCAFS LC-17A	Explorer 26	Magnetospheric	MEO	Success	
16	1965-01-22; 07:55	Delta C	Thor 374; Delta 28	CCAFS LC-17A	TIROS-9	Weather Satellite	LEO / SSO	Success	
17	1965-02-03; 16:33	Delta C	Thor 411; Delta 29	CCAFS LC-17B	OSO-2	Solar observation satellite	LEO	Success	
18	1965-04-06; 23:45	Delta D	Thor 426; Delta 30	CCAFS LC-17A	Intelsat I (Intelsat-1-1 / Early Bird)	Communication satellite	GTO	Success	Performed first transcontinental satellite TV broadcast.
19	1965-05-29; 12:00	Delta C	Thor 441; Delta 31	CCAFS LC-17B	Explorer 28 (IMP-C)	Interplanetary space research satellite	HEO	Success	
20	1965-07-02; 04:04	Delta C	Thor 415; Delta 32	CCAFS LC-17B	TIROS-10	Weather Satellite	LEO / SSO	Success	
21	1965-08-25; 15:17	Delta C	Thor 434; Delta 33	CCAFS LC-17B	OSO-C	Solar observation satellite	planned: LEO	Failure	Third stage ignited while still attached to the second stage.
22	1965-11-06; 18:43	Delta E	Thor 457; Delta 34	CCAFS LC-17A	Explorer 29 (GEOS-A)	Geodetic research satellite	MEO	Success	
23	1965-12-16; 07:31	Delta E	Thor 460; Delta 35	CCAFS LC-17A	Pioneer 6	Interplanetary space research probe	Heliocentric	Success	Probe continues to work as of late 2000.
24	1966-02-03; 07:41	Delta C	Thor 445; Delta 36	CCAFS LC-17A	ESSA-1	Weather Satellite	LEO / SSO	Success	
25	1966-02-28; 13:58	Delta E	Thor 461; Delta 37	CCAFS LC-17B	ESSA-2	Weather Satellite	LEO / SSO	Success	
26	1966-05-25; 14:00	Delta C1	Thor 436; Delta 38	CCAFS LC-17B	Explorer 32 (AE-B)	Atmospheric research Satellite	LEO	Success	
27	1966-07-01; 16:04	Delta E1	Thor 467; Delta 39	CCAFS LC-17A	Explorer 33 (IMP-D)	Magnetosphere research Satellite	HEO	Success	
28	1966-08-17; 15:20	Delta E1	Thor 462; Delta 40	CCAFS LC-17A	Pioneer 7	Interplanetary space research probe	Heliocentric	Success	
29	1966-10-02; 10:34	Delta E	Thor 463; Delta 41	VAFB SLC-2E	ESSA-3	Weather Satellite	LEO / SSO	Success	First Delta launch from VAFB
30	1966-10-26; 23:05	Delta E1	Thor 464; Delta 42	CCAFS SLC-17B	Intelsat 2-1	Communication Satellite	GTO	Success	
31	1966-12-14; 19:26	Delta G	Thor 471; Delta 43	CCAFS LC-17A	Biosatellite 1	Life science research satellite	LEO	Success	
32	1967-01-11; 10:55	Delta E1	Thor 468; Delta 44	CCAFS SLC-17B	Intelsat 2-2	Communication Satellite	GTO	Success	
33	1967-01-26; 17:31	Delta E	Thor 472; Delta 45	VAFB SLC-2E	ESSA-4	Weather Satellite	LEO / SSO	Success	
34	1967-03-08; 16:19	Delta C	Thor 431; Delta 46	CCAFS LC-17A	OSO-3	Solar observation satellite	LEO	Success	
35	1967-03-23; 01:30	Delta E1	Thor 470; Delta 47	CCAFS SLC-17B	Intelsat 2-3	Communication Satellite	GTO	Success	
36	1967-04-20; 11:17	Delta E	Thor 484; Delta 48	VAFB SLC-2E	ESSA-5	Weather Satellite	LEO / SSO	Success	
37	1967-05-24; 14:06	Delta E1	Thor 486; Delta 49	VAFB SLC-2E	Explorer 34 (IMP-F)	Interplanetary space research satellite	HEO	Success	
38	1967-07-19; 14:19	Delta E1	Thor 488; Delta 50	CCAFS SLC-17B	Explorer 35 (IMP-E)	Interplanetary space research satellite	Lunar Orbit	Success	
39	1967-09-07; 22:04	Delta G	Thor 475; Delta 51	CCAFS LC-17B	Biosatellite 2	Life science research satellite	LEO	Success	
40	1967-09-28; 00:45	Delta E1	Thor 442; Delta 52	CCAFS SLC-17B	Intelsat 2-4	Communication Satellite	GTO	Success	
41	1967-10-18; 16:04	Delta C	Thor 490; Delta 53	CCAFS LC-17B	OSO-4	Solar observation satellite	LEO	Success	
42	1967-11-10; 18:00	Delta E1	Thor 480; Delta 54	VAFB SLC-2E	ESSA-6	Weather Satellite	LEO / SSO	Success	
43	1967-12-13; 14:08	Delta E1	Thor 489; Delta 55	CCAFS LC-17B	Pioneer 8 / TTS-1	Interplanetary space research probe / Technology demonstration satellite	Heliocentric	Success	
44	1968-01-11; 16:19	Delta E1	Thor 454; Delta 56	VAFB SLC-2E	Explorer 36 (GEOS-B)	Geodetic research satellite	LEO / SSO	Success	
45	1968-07-04; 17:31	Delta J	Thor 476; Delta 57	VAFB SLC-2E	Explorer 38 (RAE-A)	Radio astronomy satellite	MEO	Success	
46	1968-08-16; 11:31	Delta N	Thor 528; Delta 58	VAFB SLC-2E	ESSA-7	Weather Satellite	LEO / SSO	Success	Maiden Flight of the Long Tank Thor-Delta
47	1968-09-19; 00:09	Delta M	Thor 529; Delta 59	CCAFS SLC-17A	Intelsat 3-1	Communication Satellite	planned: GTO	Failure	Pitch gyroscope failure led to loss of control starting at T+20 seconds. RSO T+110 seconds.
48	1968-11-08; 09:46	Delta E1	Thor 479; Delta 60	CCAFS LC-17B	Pioneer 9 / TTS-2	Interplanetary space research probe / Technology demonstration satellite	Heliocentric	Success	
49	1968-12-05; 18:55	Delta E1	Thor 481; Delta 61	CCAFS LC-17B	HEOS-A	Magnetosphere research satellite	HEO	Success	
50	1968-12-15; 17:17	Delta N	Thor 532; Delta 62	VAFB SLC-2E	ESSA-8	Weather Satellite	LEO / SSO	Success	
51	1968-12-19; 00:32	Delta M	Thor 536; Delta 63	CCAFS SLC-17A	Intelsat 3-2	Communication Satellite	GTO	Success	
52	1969-01-22; 16:48	Delta C1	Thor 487; Delta 64	CCAFS LC-17B	OSO-5	Solar observation satellite	LEO	Success	
53	1969-01-30; 06:43	Delta E1	Thor 485; Delta 65	VAFB SLC-2E	ISIS-I	Ionosphere research satellite	MEO	Success	
54	1969-02-06; 00:39	Delta M	Thor 530; Delta 66	CCAFS SLC-17A	Intelsat 3-3	Communication Satellite	GTO	Success	
55	1969-02-26; 07:47	Delta E1	Thor 483; Delta 67	CCAFS SLC-17B	ESSA-9	Weather Satellite	LEO / SSO	Success	
56	1969-05-22; 02:00	Delta M	Thor 533; Delta 68	CCAFS SLC-17A	Intelsat 3-4	Communication Satellite	GTO	Success	
57	1969-06-21; 08:53	Delta E1	Thor 482; Delta 69	VAFB SLC-2W	Explorer 41 (IMP-G)	Interplanetary space research satellite	HEO	Success	
58	1969-06-29; 13:26	Delta N	Thor 539; Delta 70	CCAFS SLC-17A	Biosatellite 3	Life science research satellite	LEO	Success	
59	1969-07-26; 02:06	Delta M	Thor 547; Delta 71	CCAFS SLC-17A	Intelsat 3-5	Communication Satellite	planned: GTO	Partial failure	Stage 3 motor case ruptured, leaving spacecraft in unusable orbit
60	1969-08-09; 07:32	Delta N	Thor 548; Delta 72	CCAFS LC-17A	OSO-6 / PAC-1	Solar observation satellite / Technology test	GTO	Success	
61	1969-08-27; 21:59	Delta L	Thor 540; Delta 73	CCAFS LC-17A	Pioneer E / TTS-3	Interplanetary space research probe / Technology demonstration satellite	planned: Heliocentric	Failure	Defective valve in Stage 1 caused a hydraulic fluid leak and loss of engine gimbaling at T+220 seconds, making it impossible for the second stage to reach orbit. RSO T+480 seconds.
62	1969-11-22; 00:37	Delta M	Thor 554; Delta 74	CCAFS SLC-17A	Skynet 1A	Military communication Satellite	GTO	Success	
63	1970-01-15; 00:16	Delta M	Delta 75; Thor 557	CCAFS SLC-17A	Intelsat 3-6	Communication satellite	GTO	Success	
64	1970-01-23; 11:52	Delta N6	Delta 76; Thor 542	VAFB SLC-2W	ITOS 1 / Oscar 5	Weather Satellite / Amateur radio satellite	LEO / SSO	Success	
65	1970-03-20; 23:46	Delta M	Delta 77; Thor 558	CCAFS SLC-17A	NATO 1	Military communication satellite	GTO	Success	
66	1970-04-23; 00:46	Delta M	Delta 78; Thor 559	CCAFS SLC-17A	Intelsat 3-7	Communication satellite	GTO	Success	
67	1970-07-23; 23:23	Delta M	Delta 79; Thor 563	CCAFS SLC-17A	Intelsat 3-8	Communication satellite	GTO	Success	
68	1970-08-19; 12:11	Delta M	Delta 80; Thor 561	CCAFS SLC-17A	Skynet-1B	Military communication satellite	GTO	Success	
69	1970-12-11; 11:35	Delta N6	Delta 81; Thor 546	VAFB SLC-2W	NOAA-1	Weather Satellite	LEO / SSO	Success	
80	1971-02-03; 01:41	Delta M	Delta 82; Thor 560	CCAFS SLC-17A	NATO 2	Military communication satellite	GTO	Success	
71	1971-03-13; 16:15	Delta M6	Delta 83; Thor 562	CCAFS SLC-17A	Explorer 43 (IMP-H)	Magnetosphere research satellite	HEO	Success	
72	1971-04-01; 02:53	Delta E1	Delta 84; Thor 491	VAFB SLC-2E	ISIS-II	Ionosphere research satellite	LEO / SSO	Success	
73	1971-09-29; 09:50	Delta N	Delta 85; Thor 565	CCAFS SLC-17A	OSO 7 / TTS-4	Solar observation satellite / Technology demonstration	LEO, 321×572 km, 93.2 min, i=33.1°, e=0.0184	Success	2nd stage suffered a failure of the attitude control system, however the satellite reached orbit and ground controllers were able to correct its flight path.
74	1971-10-21; 11:32	Delta N6	Delta 86; Thor 572	VAFB SLC-2E	ITOS-B	Weather Satellite	planned: LEO / SSO	Failure	2nd stage oxidizer leak starting at T+20 seconds. The attitude control system ran out of propellant trying to correct the stage's flight path and the launch vehicle reentered the atmosphere and broke up above the Arctic Circle.
75	1972-01-31; 17:20	Delta L	Delta 87; Thor 564	VAFB SLC-2E	HEOS-2	Magnetosphere research satellite	HEO	Success	
76	1972-03-12; 00:00	Delta N	Delta 88; Thor 573	VAFB SLC-2E	TD-1A	Astronomical research satellite	LEO / SSO	Success	
77	1972-07-23; 18:06	Delta 904	Delta 89; Thor 574	VAFB SLC-2W	Landsat 1	Earth Resource Technology Satellite	917 km LEO, near polar, Sun synchronous.	Success	First use of 9 strap-on SRBs. Discovered Landsat Island.
78	1972-09-23; 13:20	Delta 1604	Delta 90; Thor 579	CCAFS SLC-17B	Explorer 47 (IMP-I)	Magnetospheric research satellite	HEO	Success	First successful flight of Delta-1000 series.
79	15 October 1972; 17:17	Delta 300	Delta 91; Thor 575	VAFB, SLC-2W	NOAA-2 / AMSAT-OSCAR 6	Weather satellite / Amateur radio satellite	LEO / SSO	Success	
80	1972-11-10; 01:14	Delta 1914	Delta 92; Thor 580	CCAFS SLC-17B	Anik-A1	Communication Satellite	GTO	Success	
81	1972-12-11; 07:56	Delta 900	Delta 93; Thor 577	VAFB SLC-2W	Nimbus-5	Weather Satellite	LEO / SSO	Success	
82	1973-04-20; 23:47	Delta 1914	Delta 94; Thor 583	CCAFS SLC-17B	Anik-A2	Communication Satellite	GTO	Success	
83	1973-06-10; 14:13	Delta 1913	Delta 95; Thor 581	CCAFS SLC-17B	Explorer 49 (RAE-B)	Radio astronomy satellite	Lunar Orbit	Success	
84	1973-07-16; 17:10	Delta 300	Delta 96; Thor 578	VAFB SLC-2W	ITOS-E	Weather Satellite	planned: LEO / SSO	Failure	Hydraulic pump malfunction led to failure of the 2nd stage attitude control system. The booster and payload reentered the atmosphere and broke up.
85	1973-10-26; 02:26	Delta 1604	Delta 97; Thor 582	CCAFS SLC-17B	Explorer 50 (IMP-J)	Magnetospheric research satellite	HEO	Success	
86	1973-11-06; 14:02	Delta 300	Delta 98; Thor 576	VAFB SLC-2W	NOAA-3	Weather Satellite	LEO / SSO	Success	
87	1973-12-16; 06:18	Delta 1900	Delta 99; Thor 585	VAFB SLC-2W	Explorer 51 (AE-C)	Atmospheric research satellite	MEO	Success	
88	1974-01-19; 01:38	Delta 2313	Delta 100; Thor 587	CCAFS SLC-17B	Skynet-2A	Military communication satellite	planned: GTO	Failure	First flight of the Delta 2000 series. Stage 2 electronics package short circuited (induced by a piece of conductive contaminant shaken loose during launch), leading to loss of control.
89	1974-04-13; 21:33	Delta 2914	Delta 101; Thor 588	CCAFS SLC-17B	Westar-1	Communication satellite	GTO	Success	
90	1974-05-17; 10:31	Delta 2914	Delta 102; Thor 590	CCAFS SLC-17B	SMS-1	Weather satellite	GTO	Success	
91	1974-10-10; 22:53	Delta 2914	Delta 103; Thor 589	CCAFS SLC-17B	Westar-2	Communication satellite	GTO	Success	
92	1974-11-15; 17:11	Delta 2310	Delta 104; Thor 592	VAFB SLC-2W	NOAA-4 / Oscar 7 / Intasat	Weather Satellite / Amateur radio satellite / Ionosphere research	LEO / SSO	Success	
93	1974-11-23; 00:28	Delta 2313	Delta 105; Thor 591	CCAFS SLC-17B	Skynet-2B	Military communication satellite	GTO	Success	
94	1974-12-19; 02:39	Delta 2914	Delta 106; Thor 599	CCAFS SLC-17B	Symphonie-1	Communication satellite	GTO	Success	
95	1975-01-22; 17:56	Delta 2910	Delta 107; Thor 598	VAFB SLC-2W	Landsat 2	Earth Resource Technology Satellite	917 km LEO, near polar, Sun synchronous.	Success	Satellite operated until Feb 25, 1982.
96	1975-02-06; 22:04	Delta 2914	Delta 108; Thor 593	CCAFS SLC-17B	SMS-2	Weather satellite	GTO	Success	
97	1975-04-10; 23:50	Delta 1410	Delta 109; Thor 584	VAFB SLC-2W	GEOS-C	Geodetic research satellite	LEO	Success	
98	1975-05-07; 23:35	Delta 2914	Delta 110; Thor 596	CCAFS SLC-17B	Anik-A3	Communication Satellite	GTO	Success	
99	1975-06-12; 08:12	Delta 2910	Delta 111; Thor 595	VAFB SLC-2W	Nimbus-6	Weather Satellite	LEO / SSO	Success	
100	1975-06-21; 11:43	Delta 1910	Delta 112; Thor 586	CCAFS SLC-17B	OSO-8	Solar observation satellite	LEO	Success	
101	1975-08-09; 01:47	Delta 2913	Delta 113; Thor 602	VAFB SLC-2W	COS-B	High-energy astronomy research satellite	HEO	Success	
102	1975-08-27; 01:42	Delta 2914	Delta 114; Thor 594	CCAFS SLC-17A	Symphonie-2	Communication satellite	GTO	Success	
103	1975-10-06; 09:01	Delta 2910	Delta 115; Thor 600	VAFB SLC-2W	Explorer 54 (AE-D)	Atmospheric research satellite	MEO	Success	
104	1975-10-16; 22:40	Delta 2914	Delta 116; Thor 597	CCAFS SLC-17B	GOES-A (GOES-1)	Weather satellite	GTO	Success	
105	1975-11-20; 02:06	Delta 2910	Delta 117; Thor 604	CCAFS SLC-17B	Explorer 55 (AE-E)	Atmospheric research satellite	MEO	Success	
106	1975-12-13; 01:56	Delta 3914	Delta 118; Thor 607	CCAFS SLC-17A	Satcom-1	Communication satellite	GTO	Success	First flight of the Delta 3000 series.
107	1976-01-17; 23:28	Delta 2914	Delta 119; Thor 606	CCAFS SLC-17B	CTS 1 Hermes	Experimental communication satellite	GTO	Success	
108	1976-02-19; 22:32	Delta 2914	Delta 120; Thor 603	CCAFS SLC-17B	Marisat-1	Communication satellite	GTO	Success	
109	1976-03-26; 22:42	Delta 3914	Delta 121; Thor 610	CCAFS SLC-17A	Satcom-2	Communication satellite	GTO	Success	
110	1976-04-22; 20:46	Delta 2914	Delta 122; Thor 608	CCAFS SLC-17B	NATO 3A	Military communication satellite	GTO	Success	
111	1976-05-04; 08:00	Delta 2913	Delta 123; Thor 609	VAFB SLC-2W	LAGEOS-1	Geodesic research satellite	MEO	Success	
112	1976-06-10; 00:09	Delta 2914	Delta 124; Thor 601	CCAFS SLC-17A	Marisat-2	Communication satellite	GTO	Success	
113	1976-07-08; 23:31	Delta 2914	Delta 125; Thor 611	CCAFS SLC-17A	Palapa-A1	Communication satellite	GTO	Success	
114	1976-07-29; 17:07	Delta 2310	Delta 126; Thor 605	VAFB SLC-2W	NOAA-5	Weather satellite	LEO / SSO	Success	
115	1976-10-14; 22:44	Delta 2914	Delta 127; Thor 614	CCAFS SLC-17A	Marisat-3	Communication satellite	GTO	Success	
116	1977-01-28; 00:49	Delta 2914	Delta 128; Thor 613	CCAFS SLC-17A	NATO 3B	Military communication satellite	GTO	Success	
117	1977-03-10; 23:16	Delta 2914	Delta 129; Thor 612	CCAFS SLC-17A	Palapa-A2	Communication satellite	GTO	Success	
118	1977-04-20; 10:15	Delta 2914	Delta 130; Thor 617	CCAFS SLC-17B	ESA-GEOS-1	Magnetosphere research satellite	planned: GTO	Partial failure	Premature separation of second and third stages led to failure of Stage 3 spin up.
119	1977-06-16; 10:51	Delta 2914	Delta 131; Thor 616	CCAFS SLC-17B	GOES-B (GOES-2)	Weather satellite	GTO	Success	
120	1977-07-14; 14:56	Delta 2914	Delta 132; Thor 618	CCAFS SLC-17B	GMS-1	Weather satellite	GTO	Success	
121	1977-08-25; 23:50	Delta 2313	Delta 133; Thor 615	CCAFS SLC-17B	Sirio-1	Experimental communication satellite	GTO	Success	
122	1977-09-13; 23:21	Delta 3914	Delta 134; Thor 619	CCAFS SLC-17A	OTS-1	Experimental communication satellite	planned: GTO	Failure	Launch vehicle exploded at T+52 seconds due to a rupture of the SRM #1 casing.
123	1977-10-22; 13:53	Delta 2914	Delta 135; Thor 623	CCAFS SLC-17B	Explorer 56 (ISEE-A / B)	Magnetospheric research satellites	HEO	Success	
124	1977-11-23; 01:35	Delta 2914	Delta 136; Thor 620	CCAFS SLC-17A	Meteosat-1	Weather satellite	GTO	Success	
125	1977-12-15; 00:47	Delta 2914	Delta 137; Thor 624	CCAFS SLC-17B	CS-1	Experimental communication satellite	GTO	Success	
126	1978-01-26; 17:36	Delta 2914	Delta 138; Thor 613	CCAFS SLC-17A	Explorer 57 (International Ultraviolet Explorer)	Astronomical observatory satellite	HEO	Success	Satellite operational until 1996.
127	1978-03-05; 17:54	Delta 2910	Delta 139; Thor 621	VAFB SLC-2W	Landsat 3 OSCAR 8	Earth Resource Technology Satellite	917 km LEO, near polar, Sun synchronous.	Success	Satellite decommissioned on March 21, 1983.
128	7 April 1978; 22:01	Delta 2914	Delta 140; Thor 626	CCAFS, SLC-17B	BSE-1	Direct-broadcast satellite	GTO	Success	First of Japanese BSE series, also known as "Yuri 1".
129	1978-05-11; 22:59	Delta 3914	Delta 141; Thor 627	CCAFS SLC-17A	OTS-2	Experimental communication satellite	GTO	Success	
130	1978-06-16; 10:49	Delta 2914	Delta 142; Thor 625	CCAFS SLC-17B	GOES-C (GOES-3)	Weather satellite	GTO	Success	
131	1978-07-14; 10:43	Delta 2914	Delta 143; Thor 631	CCAFS SLC-17A	ESA-GEOS-2	Magnetosphere research satellite	GTO	Success	
132	1978-08-12; 15:12	Delta 2914	Delta 144; Thor 633	CCAFS SLC-17B	Explorer 59 (ISEE-3)	Magnetospheric research satellite	HEO to Sun-Earth L1 halo orbit Eventually shifted to heliocentric	Success	First satellite to use Lagrangian point and halo orbit Later re-classified as the International Cometary Explorer. Satellite still operational as of 2014.
133	1978-10-24; 08:14	Delta 2910	Delta 145; Thor 630	VAFB SLC-2W	Nimbus-7 / CAMEO	Weather Satellite / Ionosphere research	LEO / SSO	Success	
134	1978-11-19; 00:46	Delta 2914	Delta 146; Thor 634	CCAFS SLC-17B	NATO 3C	Military communication satellite	GTO	Success	
135	1978-12-16; 00:21	Delta 3914	Delta 147; Thor 632	CCAFS SLC-17A	Anik-B1	Communication Satellite	GTO	Success	
136	1979-01-30; 21:42	Delta 2914	Delta 148; Thor 629	CCAFS SLC-17B	SCATHA (P78-2)	Military technological research satellite	HEO	Success	
137	1979-08-10; 00:20	Delta 2914	Delta 149; Thor 638	CCAFS SLC-17A	Westar-3	Communication Satellite	GTO	Success	
138	1979-12-07; 01:35	Delta 3914	Delta 150; Thor 622	CCAFS SLC-17A	Satcom-3	Communication satellite	GTO	Success	
139	1980-02-14; 15:57	Delta 3910	151 (Thor 635)	CCAFS LC-17A	Solar Maximum Mission	Solar observation satellite	LEO	Success	
140	1980-09-09; 22:27	Delta 3914	152 (Thor 637)	CCAFS LC-17A	GOES-D (GOES-4)	Weather satellite	GTO	Success	
141	1980-11-15; 22:49	Delta 3910	153 (Thor 636)	CCAFS LC-17A	SBS-1	Communications satellite	GTO	Success	
142	1981-05-22; 22:29	Delta 3914	154 (Thor 645)	CCAFS LC-17A	GOES-E (GOES-5)	Weather Satellite	GTO	Success	
143	1981-08-03; 09:56	Delta 3913	155 (Thor 642)	VAFB LC-2W	Explorer 62 / 63 (Dynamics Explorer-A/B)	Magnetosphere research satellites	MEO	Success	
144	1981-09-24; 23:09	Delta 3910	156 (Thor 641)	CCAFS LC-17A	SBS-2	Communications satellite	GTO	Success	
145	1981-10-06; 11:27	Delta 2310	157 (Thor 639)	CCAFS LC-17A	Explorer 64 (Solar Mesosphere Explorer) / Oscar-9	Atmospheric research satellite / amateur radio satellite	LEO	Success	
146	1981-11-20; 01:37	Delta 3910	158 (Thor 640)	CCAFS LC-17A	Satcom 3R	Communications satellite	GTO	Success	
147	1982-01-16; 01:54	Delta 3910	159 (Thor 643)	CCAFS LC-17A	Satcom 4	Communications satellite	GTO	Success	
148	1982-02-26; 00:04	Delta 3910	160 (Thor 644)	CCAFS LC-17A	Westar 4	Communications satellite	GTO	Success	
149	1982-04-10; 06:47	Delta 3910	161 (Thor 647)	CCAFS LC-17A	Insat 1A	Communications satellite	GTO	Success	
150	1982-06-09; 00:24	Delta 3910	162 (Thor 649)	CCAFS LC-17A	Westar 5	Communications satellite	GTO	Success	
151	1982-07-16; 17:59	Delta 3920	163 (Thor 648)	VAFB LC-2W	Landsat 4	Earth observation satellite	LEO	Success	
152	1982-08-26; 23:10	Delta 3920	164 (Thor 651)	CCAFS LC-17B	Anik D1	Communications satellite	GTO	Success	
153	1982-10-28; 01:27	Delta 3924	165 (Thor 652)	CCAFS LC-17B	Satcom 5	Communications satellite	GTO	Success	
154	1983-01-25; 02:17	Delta 3910	166 (Thor 650)	VAFB LC-2W	IRAS / PIX-2	Infrared Space telescope / Technological research	LEO	Success	
155	1983-04-11; 22:39	Delta 3924	167 (Thor 653)	CCAFS LC-17B	Satcom 6	Communications satellite	GTO	Success	
156	1983-04-28; 22:26	Delta 3914	168	CCAFS LC-17A	GOES-F (GOES-6)	Weather Satellite	GTO	Success	
157	1983-05-26; 15:18	Delta 3914	169	VAFB LC-2W	EXOSAT	X-ray Space telescope	HEO	Success	
158	1983-06-28; 23:08	Delta 3920	170	CCAFS LC-17B	Galaxy 1	Communications satellite	GTO	Success	
159	1983-07-28; 22:49	Delta 3920	171	CCAFS LC-17A	Telstar-3A	Communications satellite	GTO	Success	
160	1983-09-08; 22:52	Delta 3920	172	CCAFS LC-17B	Satcom 7	Communications satellite	GTO	Success	
161	1983-09-22; 22:16	Delta 3920	173	CCAFS LC-17A	Galaxy 2	Communications satellite	GTO	Success	
162	1984-03-01; 17:59	Delta 3920	174	VAFB LC-2W	Landsat 5 / Oscar-11	Earth observation satellite / Amateur radio satellite	LEO	Success	
163	1984-08-16; 14:30	Delta 3924	175	CCAFS LC-17A	Explorer 65 (Active Magnetospheric Particle Tracer Explorers-1/2/3)	Magnetosphere research satellites	HEO	Success	
164	1984-09-21; 22:18	Delta 3920	176	CCAFS LC-17B	Galaxy-3	Communications satellite	GTO	Success	
165	1984-11-14; 00:34	Delta 3914	177	CCAFS LC-17A	NATO-3D	Military communications satellite	GTO	Success	
166	1986-05-03; 22:18	Delta 3914	178	CCAFS LC-17A	GOES-G	Weather Satellite	planned: GTO	Failure	Electric failure in first stage caused the rocket to lose control and was destroyed 90 seconds into flight
167	1986-09-05; 15:08	Delta 3920	180	CCAFS LC-17B	Vector Sum Experiment (USA-19)	Experimental on-orbit ASAT test satellite	LEO	Success	
168	1987-02-26; 23:05	Delta 3914	179	CCAFS LC-17A	GOES-H (GOES-7)	Weather Satellite	GTO	Success	
169	1987-03-20; 22:22	Delta 3920	182	CCAFS LC-17B	Palapa B2P	Communications satellite	GTO	Success	
170	1988-02-08; 22:07	Delta 3910	181	CCAFS LC-17B	Thrusted Vector Experiment (USA-30)	Experimental on-orbit ASAT test satellite	LEO	Success	
171	1989-03-24; 21:50	Delta 3920-8	183	CCAFS LC-17B	Delta Star (USA-36)	Experimental on-orbit ASAT test satellite	LEO	Success	
172	1989-08-27; 22:59	Delta 4925-8	187	CCAFS LC-17B	BSB-R1 (Marcopolo 1)	Communications satellite	GTO	Success	
173	1989-11-18; 14:34	Delta 5920-8	189	VAFB LC-2W	COBE	Cosmology observation satellite	LEO	Success	
174	June 12, 1990; 05:52	Delta 4925-8		CCAFS LC-17B	INSAT 1D	Comsat	GTO	Success	Comsat, Last Delta I launch

== Orbital debris ==
At least eight Delta rockets have contributed orbital debris in the Sun-synchronous low Earth orbit environment. The variant of the Delta upper stage that was used in the 1970s was found to be prone to in-orbit explosions. Starting in 1981, depletion burns – to get rid of excess propellant – became standard, and no Delta Rocket Bodies launched after 1981 experience severe fragmentations afterward, but some of those launched prior to 1981 continued to explode. In 1991, the Delta 1975-052B fragmented, 16 years after launch, demonstrating the resilience of the propellant.

In 2017, Delta 1 Rocket Body 1968-114B, using an earlier less fragmentation-prone upper stage, fragmented into 17 pieces, nearly 50 years after launch. Though one possibility is that this rocket body exploded, the signature of the debris cloud is more indicative of a low-energy collision.
