= List of rockets of the United States =

== Launchers ==
1940s

- MX-774 (1946)

1950s

- PGM-11 Redstone (1950–1964)
- SM-65 Atlas (1953–1965)
- PGM-19 Jupiter (1954–1961)
- PGM-17 Thor (1957–1960)
- SM-65A Atlas (1957–1958)
- Vanguard (1957–1959)
- Juno I (1958)
- SM-65B Atlas (1958–1959)
- Thor-Able (1958–1960)
- Juno II (1958–1961)
- SM-65C Atlas (1958 - 1959)
- Titan I (1959–1965)
- SM-65D Atlas (1959–1967)
- Atlas-Able (1959–1960)
- Thor-Agena (1959-1968)
- Little Joe (1959–1961)

1960s

- Atlas-Agena (1960–1978)
- Thor-Ablestar (1960–1965)
- Thor-Delta (1960–1962)
- SM-65E Atlas (1960-1995)
- Mercury-Redstone Launch Vehicle (1960–1961)
- Atlas LV-3B (1960–1963)
- Scout (1961–1994)
- Saturn I (1961–1965)
- SM-65F Atlas (1961-1981)
- Titan II (1962-2003)
- LGM-30 Minuteman (1962-1970)
- Atlas-Centaur (1962–1983)
- Delta A (1962)
- Delta B (1962–1964)
- Little Joe II (1963–1966)
- Delta C (1963–1969)
- Titan II GLV (1964–1966)
- Delta D (1964–1965)
- Titan IIIA (1964–1965)
- Thor-Burner (1965–1976)
- Titan IIIC (1965–1982)
- Atlas E/F (1965–2001)
- Delta E (1965–1971)
- Atlas SLV-3 (1966–1968)
- Saturn IB (1966–1975)
- Titan IIIB (1966–1987)
- Thorad-Agena (1966 - 1972)
- Delta G (1966–1967)
- Saturn V (1967–1973)
- Delta J (1968)
- Delta L (1969–1972)
- Delta M (1968–1972)
- Delta N (1968–1972)

1970s

- Titan IIID (1971–1982)
- Delta 0100 (1972–1973)
- Delta 1000 (1972–1975)
- Titan IIIE (1974–1977)
- Delta 2000 (1974–1981)
- Delta 3000 (1975–1989)
- Thor DSV-2U (1976–1980)

1980s

- Conestoga (1981–1995)
- Space Shuttle (1981–2011)
- Titan 34D (1982–1989)
- Atlas H (1983–1987)
- Atlas G (1984–1989)
- Titan 23G (1988–2003)
- Delta II (1989–2018)
- Titan IV (1989–2005)
- Delta 4000 (1989–1990)
- Delta 5000 (1989)

1990s

- Pegasus (1990–2026)
- Commercial Titan III (1990–1992)
- Atlas I (1990–1997)
- Atlas II (1991–2004)
- Minotaur-C/Taurus (1994–present)
- Athena (1995–2001)
- Delta III (1998–2000)

2000s

- Minotaur I (2000–present)
- Minotaur II (2000–present)
- Atlas III (2000–2005)
- Atlas V (2002–present)
- Delta IV (2002–2024)
- Falcon 1 (2006–2009)
- Ares I (2009)

2010s

- Minotaur IV (2010–present)
- Falcon 9 (2010–present)
- Antares (2013–present)
- Minotaur V (2013-present)
- New Shepard (2015-present)
- Electron (2017–present)
- Falcon Heavy (2018–present)

2020s

- Rocket 3 (2020–2022)
- LauncherOne (2020–2023)
- Firefly Alpha (2021–present)
- Space Launch System (2022–present)
- RS1 (2023)
- Terran 1 (2023)
- SpaceX Starship (2023–present)
- Vulcan Centaur (2024–present)
- New Glenn (2025-present)
- Rocket 4 (Under development, expected 2025)
- Neutron (Under development, expected 2025)
- Nova (Under development, expected 2025)
- Terran R (Under development, expected 2026)
- Eclipse (Under development, expected 2026)

== Sounding rockets ==
1940s

- WAC Corporal (1945–1947)
- Deacon(1947–1957)
- Aerobee (1947–1958)
- Bumper-WAC (1948–1950)

1950s

- Loki (1955–2001)
- Asp (1955–1962)
- Jupiter-C (1956–1957)
- Skylark (1957–2005)
- Arcas (1959–1991)
- Javelin (1959–1976)

1960s

- Astrobee (1960–1983)
- Nike Apache (1961–1978)
- Thor DSV-2 (1962–1975)
- Hopi Dart (1963–1964)

2000's

- SpaceLoft XL (2006–present)
- Mesquito (2008–present)
- ALV X-1 (2008)
