= Biosatellite program =

Series of 3 NASA satellites to assess the effects of spaceflight on living organisms

Biosatellite
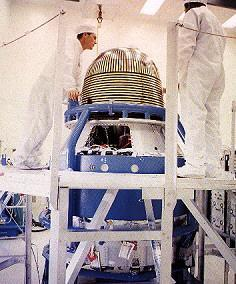
- Biosatellite 3
- Manufacturer: General Electric
- Country of origin: United States
- Operator: NASA
- Applications: Bioscience

Specifications
- Regime: Low Earth orbit
- Design life: 8-30 days

Production
- Status: Retired
- Launched: 3
- Maiden launch: Biosatellite 1; 14 December 1966
- Last launch: Biosatellite 3; 29 June 1969

NASA's Biosatellite program was a series of three uncrewed artificial satellites to assess the effects of spaceflight, especially radiation and weightlessness, on living organisms. Each was designed to reenter Earth's atmosphere and be recovered at the end of its mission.

Its primary goal was to determine the effects of space environment, particularly weightlessness, on life processes at three levels of organization: basic biochemistry of the cell; structure of growth of cells and tissues; and growth and form of entire plants and animals.

== Biosatellite 1 ==
Biosatellite 1, also known as Biosat 1 and Biosatellite A, was the first mission in the Biosatellite program. It was launched on December 14, 1966, by a Delta G rocket from Launch Complex 17A of the Cape Canaveral Air Force Station. Biosatellite 1 was the first series Biosatellite satellites. It was inserted in an initial orbit of 296 km perigee, 309 km apogee and 33.5 degrees of orbital inclination, with a period 90.5 minutes.

Biosatellite 1 carried several specimens for the study of the effects of the space environment on biological processes. Prior to reentry, the entry capsule separated from the satellite bus properly, but its deorbit motor failed to ignite, leaving it stranded in a slowly decaying orbit. It re-entered and disintegrated on February 15, 1967.

== Biosatellite 2 ==
Biosatellite 2, also known as Biosat 2 and Biosatellite B, was the second mission in the Biosatellite program. It was launched on September 7, 1967, by a Delta G rocket from Launch Complex 17B of the Cape Canaveral Air Force Station.

Biosatellite 2 carried thirteen biological experiments involving insects, frog eggs, plants and microorganisms. The mission was ended early due to a tropical storm threat. Despite returning approximately a day early, its 45 hours of earth-orbital flight enabled valid conclusions to be made in the thirteen experiments on board, by comparing the onboard samples to earthbound control organisms.

== Biosatellite 3 ==
Biosatellite 3, also known as Biosat 3 and Biosatellite D, was the third mission in the Biosatellite program.

Though the mission's scientific agenda was a failure, Biosatellite 3 was influential in shaping the life sciences flight experiment program, pointing to the need for centralised management, realistic goals and substantial pre-flight experiment verification testing. The mission objective was to investigate the effect of space flight on brain states, behavioural performance, cardiovascular status, fluid and electrolyte balance, and metabolic state.

== Table ==
| Satellite | Rocket | Launch date | Launch site | Decay date | COSPAR ID | SATCAT |
|---|---|---|---|---|---|---|
| Biosatellite 1 | Delta G | 14 December 1966 | Cape Canaveral LC-17B | 15 February 1967 | 1966-114A | 02632 |
| Biosatellite 2 | Delta G | 7 September 1967 | Cape Canaveral LC-17B | 4 October 1967 | 1967-083B | 09236 |
| Biosatellite 3 | Delta N | 29 June 1969 | Cape Canaveral LC-17A | 7 July 1969 | 1969-056A | 04000 |

== Gallery ==
Biosatellite program

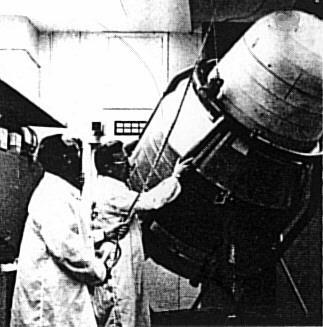
Biosatellite 1

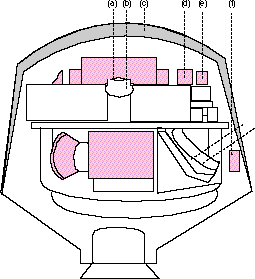
Drawing of Biosatellite 2

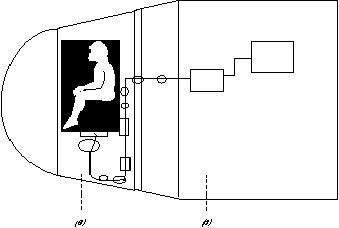
Location of the monkey on the Biosatellite 3

== See also ==
- Bion space program
- BIOPAN
- Biosatellite
- EXPOSE
- List of microorganisms tested in outer space
- O/OREOS
- OREOcube
- Tanpopo
