= Biosatellite 3 =

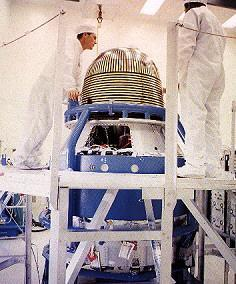
- Biosatellite 3 satellite.
- Mission type: Bioscience
- Operator: NASA / ARC
- COSPAR ID: 1969-056A
- SATCAT no.: 4000
- Mission duration: 8.8 days

Spacecraft properties
- Manufacturer: General Electric
- Launch mass: 1,546 kilograms (3,408 lb)

Start of mission
- Launch date: 29 June 1969, 03:15:59 UTC
- Rocket: Delta N 539/D70
- Launch site: Cape Canaveral LC-17A

End of mission
- Landing date: 7 July 1969
- Landing site: Oahu, Hawaii, USA

Orbital parameters
- Reference system: Geocentric
- Regime: Low Earth
- Eccentricity: 0.00144
- Perigee altitude: 221 kilometers (137 mi)
- Apogee altitude: 240 kilometers (150 mi)
- Inclination: 33.5º
- Period: 92 minutes

Biosatellite 3, also known as Biosat 3 and Biosatellite D, was a third and final mission in the Biosatellite program. It was launched on a Delta-N rocket from Cape Canaveral Air Force Station on June 29, 1969.

The intent had been to fly a 6-kg male Southern pig-tailed macaque (Macaca nemestrina) named "Bonny" in low Earth orbit for 30 days. However, after only 8.8 days in orbit, the mission was terminated because of the subject's deteriorating health. High development costs were a strong incentive for maximising the scientific return from the mission. Because of this, the scientific goals had become exceedingly ambitious over time, and a great many measurements were conducted on the single research subject flown. Although the mission was highly successful from a technical standpoint, the science results were apparently compromised. Bonny, dubbed an "astromonk" by the American press (as opposed to the chimpanzees from earlier American missions who were nicknamed "chimponauts") died on 8 July, one day after the biological capsule's successful recovery from the Pacific.

Despite failing its scientific agenda, Biosatellite 3 was influential in shaping the life sciences flight experiment program, pointing to the need for centralised management, realistic goals and substantial pre-flight experiment verification testing. The mission objective was to investigate the effect of space flight on brain states, behavioural performance, cardiovascular status, fluid and electrolyte balance, and metabolic state.

== Experiments ==
- Determination of Bone Mineral Loss during Prolonged Weightlessness
- Effects of Prolonged Space Flight on Brain Functions and Performance

== See also ==
- Biosatellite 2
- Bion program
