= Biosatellite 2 =

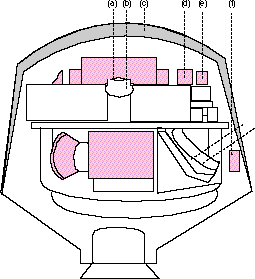
- Drawing of Biosatellite 2.
- Mission type: Bioscience
- Operator: NASA / ARC
- COSPAR ID: 1967-083B
- SATCAT no.: 9236
- Mission duration: 2 days

Spacecraft properties
- Manufacturer: General Electric
- Launch mass: 955 kilograms (2,105 lb)

Start of mission
- Launch date: 7 September 1967, 22:04:26 UTC
- Rocket: Delta G 475/D51
- Launch site: Cape Canaveral LC-17B rp

End of mission
- Landing date: 9 September 1967
- Landing site: Hawaii, USA

Orbital parameters
- Reference system: Geocentric
- Regime: Low Earth
- Eccentricity: 0.00202
- Perigee altitude: 286 kilometres (178 mi)
- Apogee altitude: 313 kilometres (194 mi)
- Inclination: 33.5º
- Period: 90.8 minutes
- Epoch: 7 September 1967

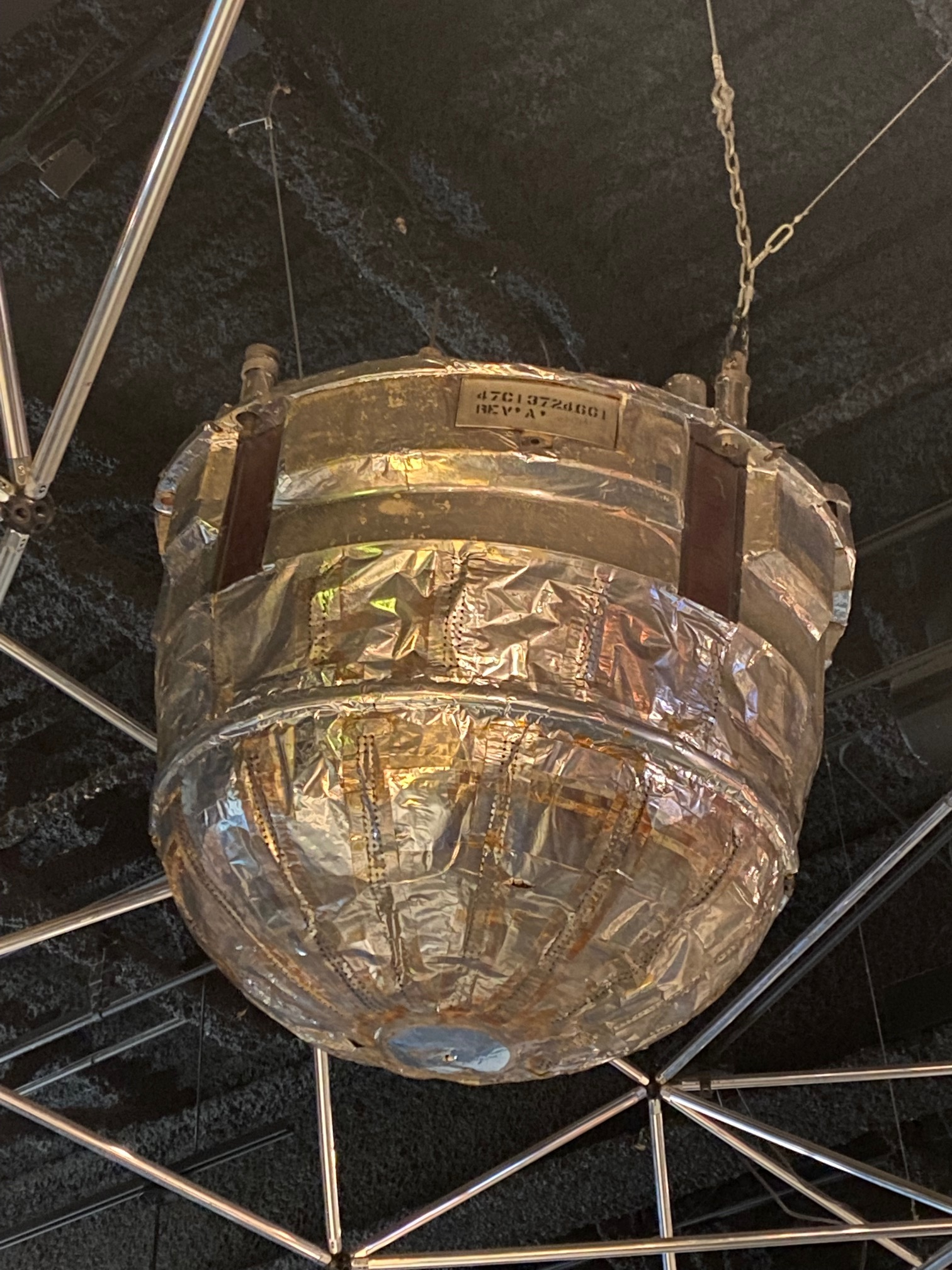
The satellite as displayed in the Henry Crown Space Center at the Museum of Science and Industry, Chicago.

Biosatellite 2, also known as Biosat 2 or Biosatellite B, was the second mission in NASA's Biosatellite program for biological research. It was launched on September 7, 1967, by a Delta G rocket from Cape Canaveral Air Force Station in Florida.

Biosatellite 2 carried 13 biological experiments involving insects, frog eggs, plants and microorganisms. The mission was ended early because of a tropical storm threat in the recovery area and communication problems between the capsule and ground stations. The main objective of the mission was to determine if the radiation sensitivity of living organisms in space is greater or less than on land, for which disposed of a radiation source in front of the capsule.

The satellite is currently the property of the National Air and Space Museum, reference number A19731629000. It is currently on loan to the Museum of Science and Industry, Chicago.

== Experiments ==
- Effects of Weightlessness on Wheat Seedling Morphogenesis and Histochemistry
- Growth Physiology of the Wheat Seedling in Space
- Biochemical Changes in the Developing Wheat Seedling in a Weightless State
- Effect of Sub-gravity on the Dividing Egg of Rana Pipiens
- Mutational Response of Habrobracon
- Liminal Angle of a Plagiogeotropic Organ
- Effects of Radiation and Weightlessness on Tribolium Pupae
- Effects of Weightlessness on Radiation Induced Somatic Dam. in Drosophila Larvae
- Effects of Space on Radiation-Induced Damage to Reproductive Cells of Drosophila Adults and Pupae
- Genetic and Cytologic Studies of Tradescantia Irradiated During Flight
- Combined Effects of Weightlessness and Radiation on Inact.+ Mutation in Neurospora
- Space Flight Effects + Gamma Radiation Interaction on Growth + Induc.of Bacteria
- Effect of Weightlessness on Amoeba, Pelomyxa Carolinensis
- Effects of Weightlessness on the Nutrition and Growth of Pelomyxa carolinensis

== See also ==
- Biosatellite 1
- Biosatellite 3
- Bion program
