= Delta (rocket family) =

Rocket family

Delta Family
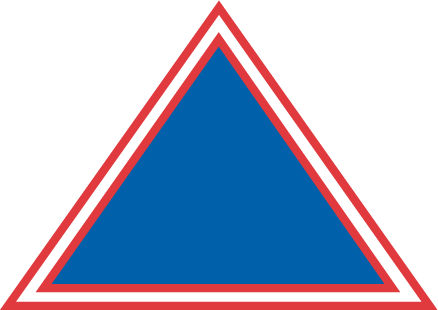

- Delta II through Delta IV

General information
- Type: Expendable launch system
- Manufacturer: Douglas Aircraft Company (1960–1967); McDonnell Douglas (1960–1997); Boeing (1997–2006); United Launch Alliance (2006–2024)
- Status: Out of service

History
- Introduction date: 13 May 1960 (Echo 1)
- First flight: May 13, 1960; 66 years ago
- Retired: 9 April 2024 (NROL-70)

The Delta rocket family was a versatile range of American rocket-powered expendable launch systems that provided space launch capability in the United States from 1960 to 2024. Japan also launched license-built derivatives (N-I, N-II, and H-I) from 1975 to 1992. More than 300 Delta rockets were launched with a 95% success rate. The series was phased out in favor of the Vulcan Centaur, with the Delta IV Heavy rocket's last launch occurring on April 9, 2024.

== Origins ==
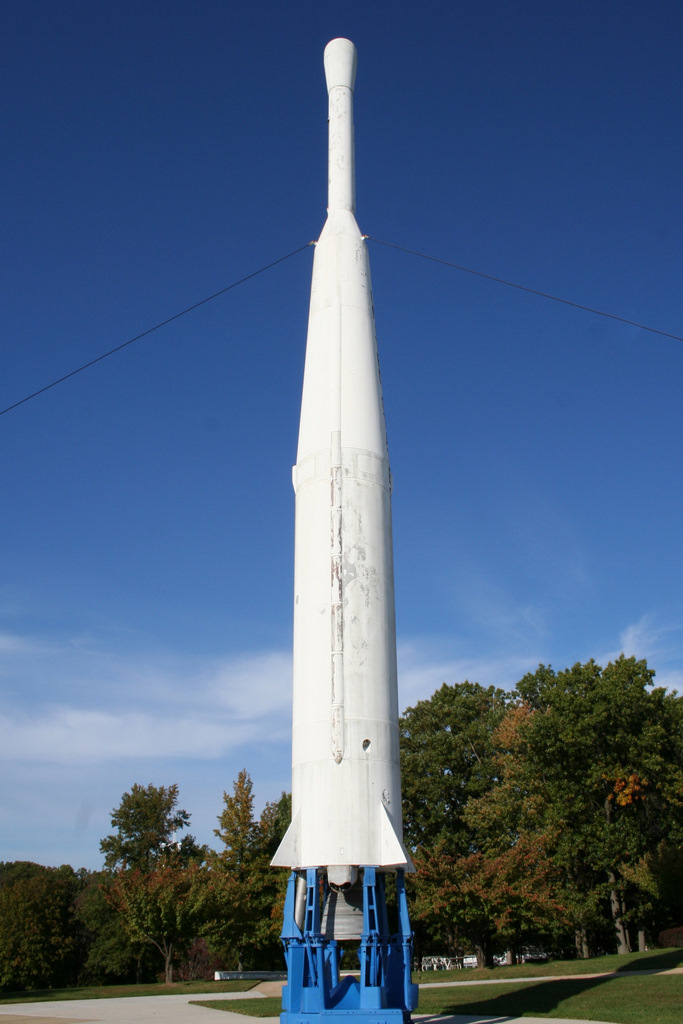
Delta rocket on display at the Goddard Space Flight Center

The original Delta rockets used a modified version of the PGM-17 Thor, the first ballistic missile deployed by the United States Air Force (USAF), as their first stage. The Thor had been designed in the mid-1950s to reach Moscow from bases in Britain or similar allied nations, and the first wholly successful Thor launch had occurred in September 1957. Subsequent satellite and space probe flights soon followed, using a Thor first stage with several different upper stages. The fourth upper-stage combination of the Thor was named the Thor "Delta", reflecting the fourth letter of the Greek alphabet. Eventually the entire Thor–Delta launch vehicle came to be called simply "Delta".NASA intended Delta as "an interim general-purpose vehicle" to be "used for communication, meteorological, and scientific satellites and lunar probes during 1960 and 1961". The plan was to replace Delta with other rocket designs when they came on-line. The Delta design emphasized reliability rather than performance by replacing components that had caused problems on earlier Thor flights; in particular, the trouble-prone inertial guidance package made by AC Spark Plug was replaced by a radio ground guidance system, which was mounted to the second stage instead of the first. NASA made the original Delta contract to the Douglas Aircraft Company in April 1959 for 12 vehicles of this design:

- Stage 1: Modified Thor IRBM with a Block I MB-3 engine group consisting of one Rocketdyne LR-79 main engine and two Rocketdyne LR-101 vernier thrusters for roll control, producing a total of 683 kN (154,000 lb_{f}) thrust, including LOX/RP1 turbopump exhaust.
- Stage 2: Modified Able. Pressure-fed UDMH/nitric acid-powered Aerojet AJ-10-118 engine producing 34 kN (7,600 lb_{f}). This reliable engine cost US$4 million to build and is still flying in modified form today. Gas-jet attitude control system.
- Stage 3: Altair. A spin-stabilized (via a turntable on top of the Able) at 100 rpm by two solid rocket motors before separation. One ABL X-248 solid rocket motor provided 12 kN (2,700 lb_{f}) of thrust for 28 seconds. The stage weighed 230 kg (510 lb) and was largely constructed of wound fiberglass.

These vehicles would be able to place 290 kg (640 lb) into a 240 to 370 km (150 to 230 mi) LEO or 45 kg (99 lb) into GTO. Eleven of the twelve initial Delta flights were successful, and until 1968, no failures occurred in the first two minutes of launch. The high degree of success achieved by Delta stood in contrast to the numerous West Coast Thor failures. The total project development and launch cost came to US$43 million, US$3 million over budget. An order for 14 more vehicles was made before 1962.

== Evolution ==
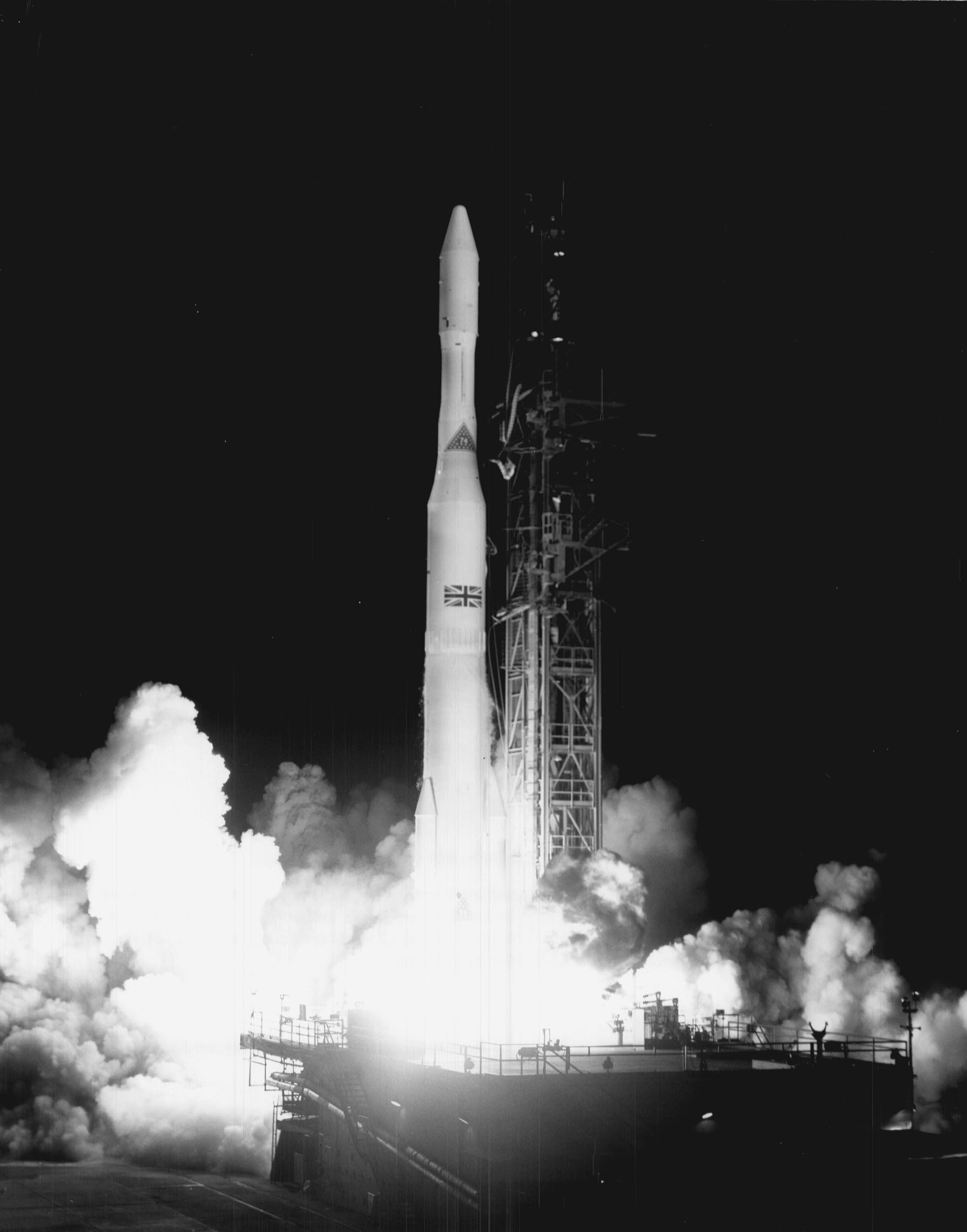
Launch of the first Skynet satellite by Delta M launch vehicle in 1969 from Cape Canaveral.

=== Delta A ===
The Delta A used the MB-3 Block II engine, with 170,000 lbf (760 kN) of thrust versus 152,000 lbf (680 kN) for the Block I.

13. 2 October 1962 – Explorer 14 (EPE-B).
14. 27 October 1962 – Explorer 15 (EPE-C).

=== Delta B ===
The Delta B introduced the upgraded AJ10-118D upper stage, a three-foot propellant tank extension, higher-energy oxidizer, and solid-state guidance system. With the Delta B the Delta program went from "interim" to "operational" status. Delta B could launch 200 lb (91 kg) to GTO.

15. 13 December 1962. Relay 1, second NASA communications satellite, the NASA communications satellite first active one.
16. 13 February 1963. Pad 17B. Syncom 1; Thiokol Corporation Star-13B solid rocket as apogee motor.
20. 26 July 1963. Syncom 2; geosynchronous orbit, but inclined 33.0° due to the limited performance of the Delta rocket.

=== Delta C ===
For Delta C, the third stage Altair was replaced with Altair 2. The Altair 2 had been developed as the ABL X-258 for the Scout vehicle and was 3 in (76 mm) longer, 10% heavier, and with 65% more total thrust. OSO 4 is an example of a Delta C launch.

=== Delta D ===
Delta D, also known as Thrust Augmented Delta, was a Delta C with the Thrust Augmented Thor core plus three Castor 1 boosters.

25. 19 August 1964. Syncom 3, the first geostationary communications satellite.
30. 6 April 1965. Intelsat I.

=== Delta E ===
First Delta E: 6 November 1965; launched GEOS 1

=== Delta F ===
This launch vehicle was not built.

=== Delta G ===
The Delta G was a Delta E without the third stage. The two-stage vehicle was used for two launches: Biosatellite 1 on 14 December 1966 and Biosatellite 2 on 7 September 1967.

=== Delta J ===
The Delta J used a larger Thiokol Star 37D motor as the third stage and was launched once on 4 July 1968 with Explorer 38.

=== Delta K ===
This launch vehicle was not built.

=== Delta L ===
The Delta L introduced the Extended Long Tank first stage with a uniform 2.4 m (7 ft 10 in) diameter and used the United Technologies FW-4D motor as a third stage.

=== Delta M ===
The Delta M first stage consisted of a Long Tank Thor with MB-3-3 engine augmented with three Castor 2 boosters. The Delta E was the second stage, with a Star 37D (Burner 2) third stage/apogee kick motor. There were 12 successful Delta M launches from 1968 until 1971.

=== Delta N ===
The Delta N combined a Long Tank Thor (MB-3-3 engine) first stage augmented with three Castor 2 boosters and a Delta E second stage. There were six successful Delta N launches from 1968 until 1972.

=== "Super Six" ===
The "Super Six" was a Delta M or Delta N with three additional Castor 2 boosters for a total of six, which was the maximum that could be accommodated. These were respectively designated Delta M6 or Delta N6. The first and only launch of the M6 configuration was Explorer 43 (IMP-H, Magnetospheric research) on 13 March 1971. Three launches of the N6 between 1970 and 1971 resulted in one failure.

- 450 kg (990 lb) to GTO

=== Delta 0100-series ===
The Delta 0100 series was the first stage of the initial numbered Delta was the Long Tank Thor, a version of the Thor missile with extended propellant tanks. Up to nine strap-on solid rocket boosters (SRBs) could be fitted. With three SRBs, the Delta was designated a 300 series, while the nine SRB variant was designated the 900 series. A new and improved Delta F second stage using the higher-thrust Aerojet AJ 10-118F engine was also introduced. The first 900 series launch was the fourth Delta 0100. On 23 July 1972, Thor-Delta 904 launched Landsat 1. A license-built version of the Long Tank Thor stage with the MB-3 engine was also used for the Japanese N-I launch vehicle.

=== Delta 1000-series ===
The Delta 1000 series was nicknamed the Straight-Eight and combined an Extended Long Tank first stage with an 8 ft-diameter (2.4 m) payload fairing, up to nine Castor 2 SRBs, and the new McDonnell Douglas Delta P second stage using the TRW TR-201 engine. Payload capacity increased to 1,835 kg (4,045 lb) to LEO or 635 kg (1,400 lb) to GTO. The first successful 1000 series Thor-Delta launched Explorer 47 on 22 September 1972. The Extended Long Tank Thor stage was also used in the Japanese N-II and H-I launch vehicles.

=== Delta 2000-series ===
The Delta 2000 introduced the new Rocketdyne RS-27 main engine on an Extended Long Tank first stage with the same constant 8-foot diameter. A Delta 2310 was the vehicle for the first three-satellite launch of NOAA-4, Intasat, and AMSAT-OSCAR 7 on 15 November 1974. Delta 2910 boosters were used to launch both Landsat 2 in 1975 and Landsat 3 in 1978. On 7 April 1978, a Delta 2914 launched "Yuri 1", the first Japanese BSE Broadcasting Satellite.

=== Delta 3000-series ===
The Delta 3000 combined the same first stage as 1000-series and 2000-series with upgraded Castor 4 solid boosters and was the last Delta series to use the McDonnell Douglas Delta P second stage with TRW TR-201 engine. Delta 3000 introduced the PAM (Payload Assist Module) / Star 48B solid-fueled kick motor, which was later used as Delta II third stage. The Delta 3914 model was approved for launching United States government payloads in May 1976 and was launched 13 times between 1975 and 1987.

=== Delta 4000-series ===
The Delta 4000-series and 5000-series were developed in the aftermath of the Challenger disaster and consisted of a combination of 3000-era and Delta II-era components. The first stage had the MB-3 main engine and Extended Long Tank of the 3000-series and mounted upgraded Castor 4A motors. The new Delta K second stage was also included. A total of three were launched in 1989 and 1990, carrying two operational payloads.

=== Delta 5000-series ===
The Delta 5000 series featured upgraded Castor 4A motors on an Extended Long Tank first stage with the new RS-27 main engine and only launched one mission.

=== Delta II (6000-series and 7000-series) ===
The Delta II series was developed after the 1986 Challenger accident and consisted of the Delta 6000-series and 7000-series, with two variants (Light and Heavy) of the latter.

The Delta 6000-series introduced the Extra Extended Long Tank first stage, which was 12 ft (3.7 m) longer, and the Castor 4A boosters. Six SRBs ignited at takeoff, and three ignited in the air.

The Delta 7000-series introduced the RS-27A main engine, which was modified for efficiency at high altitude at some cost to low-altitude performance, and the lighter and more powerful GEM-40 solid boosters from Hercules. The Delta II Med-Lite was a 7000-series with no third stage and fewer strap-ons (often three, sometimes four) that was usually used for small NASA missions. The Delta II Heavy was a Delta II 792X with the enlarged GEM-46 boosters from Delta III.

=== Delta III (8000-Series) ===
The Delta III 8000-series was a McDonnell Douglas / Boeing-developed program to keep pace with growing satellite masses:

- The two upper stages, with low-performance fuels, were replaced with a single cryogenic stage, improving performance and reducing recurring costs and pad labor. The engine was a single Pratt & Whitney RL10, from the Centaur upper stage. The hydrogen fuel tank, 4 metres in diameter is exposed, showing its orange insulation; the narrower oxygen tank and engine are covered until stage ignition. Fuel tank contracted to Mitsubishi and produced using technologies from Japanese H-II launcher.
- To keep the stack short and resistant to crosswinds, the first-stage kerosene tank was widened and shortened, matching the upper-stage and fairing diameters.
- Nine enlarged GEM-46 solid boosters were attached. Three of them have thrust-vectoring nozzles.

Of the three Delta III flights, the first two were failures, and the third carried only a dummy (inert) payload.

=== Delta IV (9000-series) ===
As part of the Air Force's Evolved Expendable Launch Vehicle (EELV) program, McDonnell Douglas / Boeing proposed Delta IV. As the program name implied, many components and technologies were borrowed from existing launchers. Both Boeing and Lockheed Martin were contracted to produce their EELV designs. Delta IVs were produced in a new facility in Decatur, Alabama.

- The first stage changed to liquid hydrogen fuel. Tank technologies derived from Delta III upper stage, but widened to 5 metres.
- The kerosene engine replaced with Rocketdyne RS-68, the first new, large liquid-fueled rocket engine designed in the United States since the Space Shuttle Main Engine (SSME) in the 1970s. Designed for low cost, it had lower chamber pressure and efficiency than the SSME, and a much simpler nozzle. Thrust chamber and upper nozzle was a channel-wall design, pioneered by Soviet engines. Lower nozzle was ablatively cooled.
- The second stage and fairing were taken from the Delta III in smaller (Delta IV Medium) models; widened to 5 metres in Medium+ and Heavy models.
- Medium+ models had two or four GEM 60, 60-inch-diameter (1.5 m) solid boosters.
- The plumbing was revised and electrical circuits eliminated need for a launch tower.

The first stage was referred to as a Common Booster Core (CBC); a Delta IV Heavy attached two extra CBCs as boosters.

==== Delta IV Heavy ====
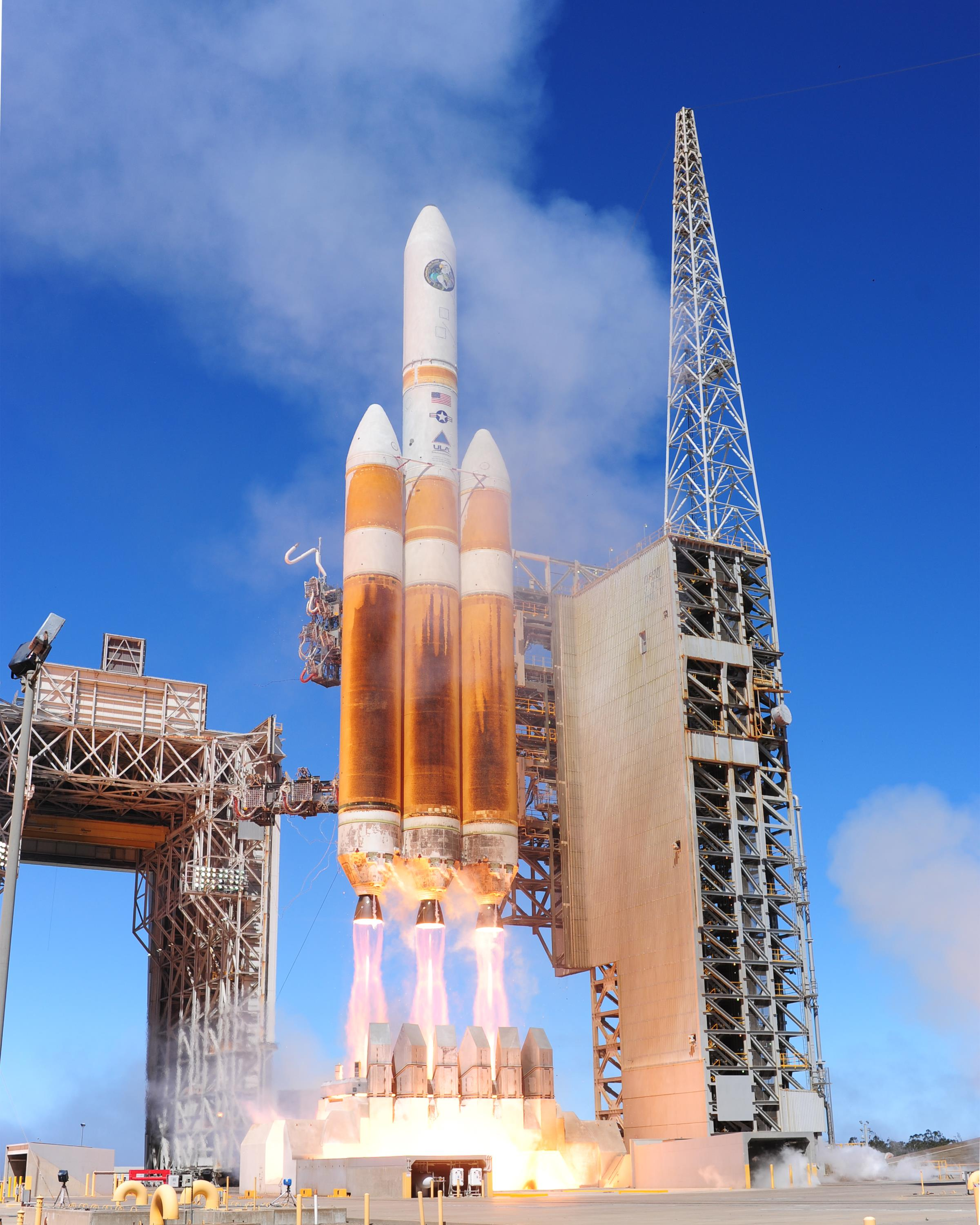
Delta IV Heavy launches from Vandenberg Space Force Base

The Delta IV Heavy (Delta 9250H) was an expendable heavy-lift launch vehicle, the largest member of the Delta IV family. Following the retirement of the Space Shuttle in 2011, it was the most capable operational launch vehicle until the Falcon Heavy's debut in 2018. At the time of its retirement in 2024, it ranked third among active rockets in payload capacity. Developed by Boeing and later manufactured by United Launch Alliance (ULA), it first flew in 2004. The Delta IV Heavy was retired after its 16th and final launch on 9 April 2024 and was succeeded by ULA's Vulcan Centaur rocket, which can offer similar heavy-lift capabilities at a lower cost with a single-core and six solid rocket boosters.

The vehicle consisted of three Common Booster Cores (CBCs), each powered by an RS-68 engine. Two served as strap-on boosters attached to a central core. During ascent, all three engines ignited at liftoff, with the central engine throttling down partway through flight to conserve propellant before throttling up again after booster separation.

A distinctive feature of Delta IV Heavy launches was the hydrogen-fueled ignition sequence, which often produced a large fireball that scorched the booster’s exterior surface.

== Launch reliability ==
From 1969 through 1978 (inclusive), Thor-Delta was NASA's most used launcher, with 84 launch attempts. (Scout was the second-most used vehicle with 32 launches.) Satellites for other government agencies and foreign governments were also launched on a cost-reimbursable basis, totaling 63 satellites. Out of the 84 launch attempts there were 7 failures or partial failures, a 91.6% success rate.

=== Orbital debris ===
The Delta was a launch success, but it has also been a significant contributor to orbital debris, as a variant used in the 1970s was prone to in-orbit explosions. Eight Delta second stages launched between 1973 and 1981 were involved in fragmentation events between 1973 and 1991 usually within the first 3 years after launch, but others have broken apart 10 or more years later. Studies determined that explosions were caused by propellant left after shutdown. The nature of the propellant and the thermal environment occupied by the derelict rockets made explosions inevitable. Depletion burns were started in 1981, and no fragmentation events for rockets launched after that have been identified. Deltas launched before the 1970s variant have had fragmentation events as long as 50 years after launch.

== Numbering system ==
In 1972, McDonnell Douglas introduced a four-digit numbering system to replace the letter-naming system. The new system could better accommodate the various changes and improvements to Delta rockets and avoided the problem of a rapidly depleting alphabet. The digits specified (1) the tank and main engine type, (2) number of solid rocket boosters, (3) second stage (letters in the following table refer to the engine), and (4) third stage:

Number	First digit (first stage/boosters)	Second digit (number of boosters)	Third digit (second stage)	Fourth digit (third stage)	Letter (Heavy configuration)
0	Long Tank Thor; MB-3 engine Castor 2 SRBs	No SRBs	Delta F*, with Aerojet AJ-10-118F engines. *References uprated Aerojet AJ-10-118 engine	No third stage	N/A
1	Extended Long Tank Thor; MB-3 engine Castor 2 SRBs	N/A	Delta P*, Douglas built with TRW TR-201 engines. *Exception: AJ-10-118F engine for Anik-A1 launch.	N/A	N/A
2	Extended Long Tank Thor; RS-27 engine Castor 2 SRBs	2 SRBs (or CBCs in the case of the Delta IV Heavy)	Delta K*, with AJ-10-118K engines. *References uprated Aerojet AJ-10-118 engine	FW-4D (unflown)	N/A
3	Extended Long Tank Thor; RS-27 engine Castor 4 SRBs	3 SRBs	Delta III cryogenic upper stage, RL10B-2 engine	Star 37D	N/A
4	Extended Long Tank Thor; MB-3 engine Castor 4A SRBs	4 SRBs	Delta IV 4m diameter cryogenic upper stage, RL10B-2 engine	Star 37E	N/A
5	Extended Long Tank Thor; RS-27 engine Castor 4A SRBs	N/A	Delta IV 5 metre diameter cryogenic upper stage, RL10B-2 engine	Star 48B / PAM-D	N/A
6	Extra-Extended Long Tank Thor; RS-27 engine Castor 4A SRBs	6 SRBs	N/A	Star 37FM	N/A
7	Extra-Extended Long Tank Thor; RS-27A engine GEM 40 SRBs	N/A	N/A	N/A	GEM 46 SRBs
8	Strengthened Extra-Extended Long Tank Thor; RS-27A engine GEM 46 SRBs	N/A	N/A	N/A	N/A
9	Delta IV Common Booster Core (CBC); RS-68 engine	9 SRBs	N/A	N/A	2 additional CBC parallel first stages

This numbering system was to have been phased out in favor of a new system that was introduced in 2005. In practice, the new system was never used, as all but the Delta II have been retired:

Number	First digit (first stage/boosters)	Second digit (number of boosters)	Third digit (second Stage)	Fourth digit (third stage)	Letter (Heavy configuration)
0	N/A	No SRBs	N/A	No third stage	N/A
1	N/A	N/A	N/A	N/A	N/A
2	Extra-Extended Long Tank Thor; RS-27A engine GEM 40 SRBs	2 SRBs (or LRBs in the case of the Delta IV Heavy)	Delta K, with AJ-10-118K engines	N/A	GEM 46 SRBs
3	Strengthened Extra-Extended Long Tank Thor; RS-27A engine GEM 46 SRBs	3 SRBs	N/A	N/A	
4	Delta IV CBC; RS-68 engine	4 SRBs	Delta IV 4 metre diameter cryogenic upper stage, RL10B-2 engine	N/A	2 additional CBC parallel first stages
5	N/A	N/A	Delta IV 5 metre diameter cryogenic upper stage, RL10B-2 engine	Star 48B / PAM-D	N/A
6	N/A	N/A	N/A	Star 37FM	N/A
7	N/A	N/A	N/A	N/A	N/A
8	N/A	N/A	N/A	N/A	N/A
9	N/A	9 SRBs	N/A	N/A	N/A

== See also ==
- Comparison of orbital launchers families
- Comparison of orbital launch systems
- List of Thor and Delta launches
- HoloVID visualization tool
- Space debris
- Project Echo
