= Delta G =

American expendable launch vehicle

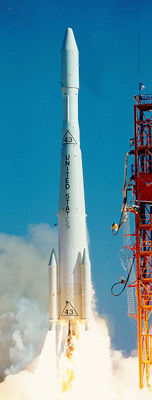
- Launch of the first Delta G with Biosatellite 1
- Function: Expendable launch system
- Country of origin: United States

Launch history
- Status: Retired
- Launch sites: Cape Canaveral LC-17
- Total launches: 2
- Success(es): 2
- First flight: 14 December 1966
- Last flight: 7 September 1967

The Delta G, or Thor-Delta G was an American expendable launch system used to launch two biological research satellites in 1966 and 1967. It was a member of the Delta family of rockets.

The Delta G was a two-stage derivative of the Delta E. The first stage was a Thor missile in the DSV-2C configuration and the second stage was a Delta E. Three Castor-1 solid rocket boosters were clustered around the first stage. The solid-fuel upper stage used on the Delta E was not used on the Delta G.

Both launches occurred from Cape Canaveral Air Force Station Launch Complex 17. The first was from pad 17A on 14 December 1966 at 19:20 GMT, with Biosatellite 1. At 22:04 on 7 September 1967, Biosatellite 2 was launched from pad B on the second Delta G.
