= Landsat 3 =

American earth observation satellite (1978–1983)

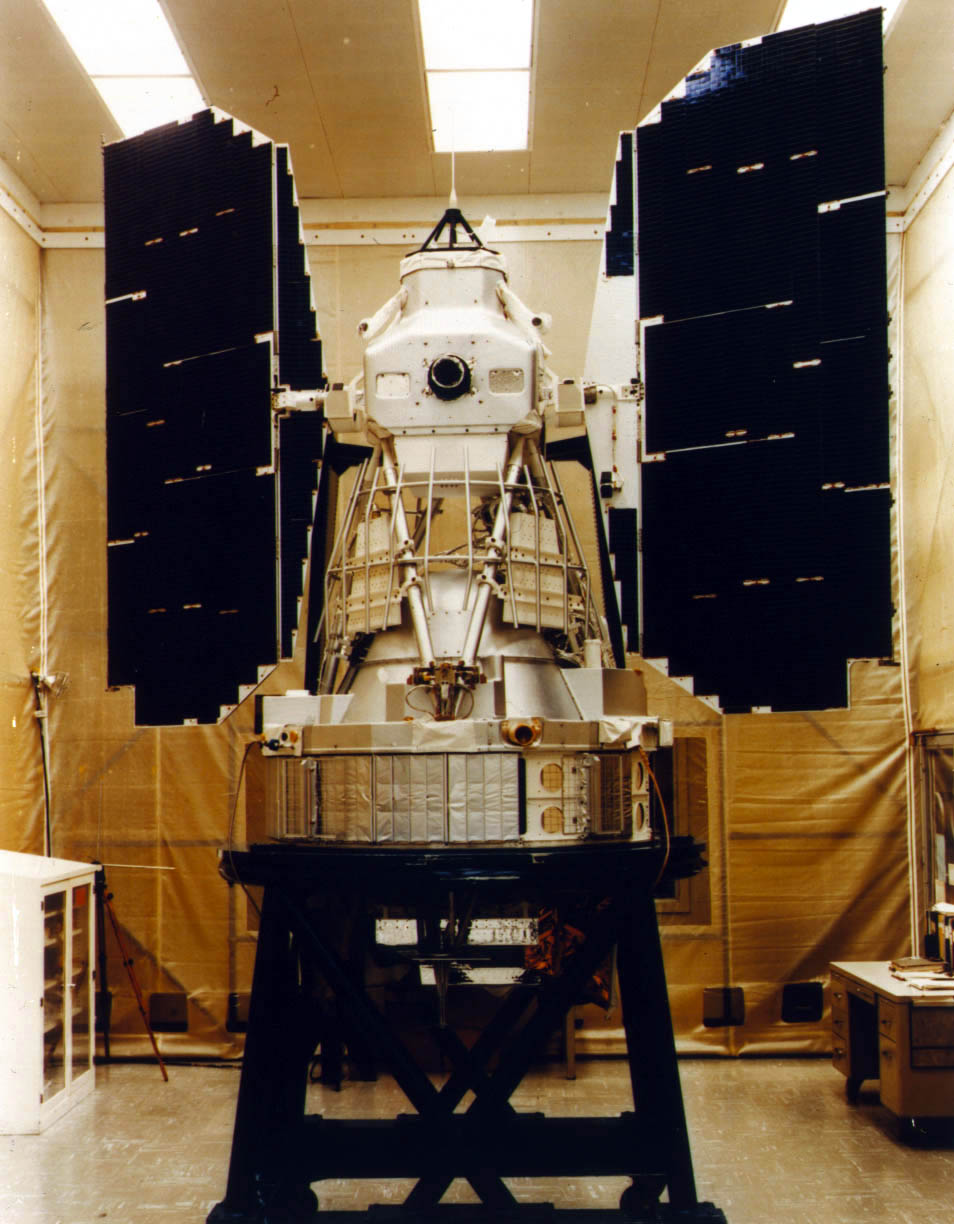
- Landsat 3 in the clean room
- Mission type: Earth imaging
- Operator: NASA
- COSPAR ID: 1978-026A
- SATCAT no.: 10702
- Mission duration: 5 years, 6 months, 2 days

Spacecraft properties
- Bus: Nimbus
- Manufacturer: GE Aerospace
- Launch mass: 960.0 kg (2,116.4 lb)

Start of mission
- Launch date: 5 March 1978, 17:54 UTC
- Rocket: Delta 2910
- Launch site: Vandenberg AFB SLC-2W

End of mission
- Deactivated: 7 September 1983

Orbital parameters
- Reference system: Geocentric
- Regime: Sun-synchronous
- Perigee altitude: 818 kilometers (508 mi)
- Apogee altitude: 918 kilometers (570 mi)
- Inclination: 99.1 degrees
- Period: 103.16 minutes
- Epoch: 15 May 1990

Landsat 3 is the third satellite of the Landsat program. It was launched on March 5, 1978, with the primary goal of providing a global archive of satellite imagery. Unlike later Landsat satellites, Landsat 3 was managed solely by NASA. Landsat 3 decommissioned on September 7, 1983, beyond its design life of one year. The data collected during Landsat 3's lifetime was used by 31 countries. Countries that cannot afford their own satellite are able to use the data for ecological preservation efforts and to determine the location of natural resources.

== Background ==
The first satellite of the Landsat program, Landsat 1 (originally designated ERTA-1), took and transmitted over 100,000 photos during its lifetime.

Landsat 3 (originally designated Landsat C) was the third satellite launched as a part of the Landsat program, and the last Landsat satellite managed by NASA. The satellite had a very similar designs to Landsat 1 and Landsat 2.

== Satellite design ==
=== Development ===
Landsat 3 was built by GE Aerospace. The objective of Landsat 3 was to extend the period of space data acquisition for Earth resources by Landsat 1 and Landsat 2. Landsat 3 was to obtain information on agricultural and forestry resources, geology and mineral resources, hydrology and water resources, geography, cartography, environmental pollution, oceanography and marine resources, and meteorological phenomena.

=== Operation ===
==== Attitude control system (ACS) ====
The spacecraft used an attitude control system (ACS) with freon gas as the propellant. Combined with horizon scanners, Sun sensors, and a command antenna, the ACS was able to control the spacecraft in all three axes to plus or minus one degree.

==== Data collection systems (DCS) ====
The satellite also carried two wide-band video tape recorders (WBVTR) capable of storing up to 30 minutes of scanner or camera data, giving the spacecraft's sensors a near-global coverage capability. Video was transmitted back to Earth in both real time and from the recorders at 2265.5 MHz.

The satellite was also equipped with a data collection system (DCS) to collect information from remote, individually equipped ground stations and to relay the data to central acquisition stations. The DCS was composed of three different collection methods. The first was the data collection platforms (DCPs), which could consist of ocean buoys, constant pressure balloons, or automatic ground stations. The second was the satellite equipment, and the third the ground data centers. Due to the orbit of the satellite, data could be obtained at a minimum of every 12 hours. No data processing or signal multiplexing occurred on the satellite. The design of the DCS came from the Nimbus-3 platform, then known as the interrogation, recording, and location system (IRLS).

=== Sensors ===
==== Multispectral Scanner (MSS) ====
Landsat 3 carried a Multispectral Scanner, built by Hughes Aircraft Corporation. The sensor weighed 64 kilograms (141 lb), required 50 W of power, and had a maximum 75 meters (246 ft) resolution. It was made up of a double reflector telescope, scanning mirror, and detectors. The primary mission of the MSS was to obtain data for agriculture, forestry, geology, and hydrology, but the MSS could also collect information for oceanography and meteorology purposes.

The MSS had five spectral bands, which is one more than Landsat 1 and 2. Each spectral band had different scientific uses. Band 4 primarily investigated areas of water, with the ability to detect sediment laden areas and areas of shallow water. Band 5 was primarily used to identify cultural features. Band 6 sensed the vegetation boundaries between land, water, and landforms. Band 7 was the most proficient at sensing through atmospheric haze, and identified water and land boundaries, vegetation, and landforms. The scene size for the scanners of the MSS was 170 kilometers (110 mi) to 185 km (115 mi), which is the area the sensors could survey per scan. The ground sampling interval of the MSS was 57 m (187 ft) to 79 m (259 ft), which is medium resolution. Unlike the previous two Landsat missions, a thermal band was built into Landsat 3's MSS, but this instrument failed shortly after the satellite was deployed on July 11, 1978. The thermal band would have enabled the MSS to have remote sensing capabilities during the night.

==== Return Beam Vidicon (RBV) ====
The Return Beam Vidicon (RBV) was designed at RCA in Princeton, New Jersey. It contained two cameras to cover the 0.53 to 0.75 micrometer spectral band. The cameras were structurally isolated from the satellite so that they could maintain their alignment. Each camera was triggered every 12.5 seconds so that the images would overlap in the direction the spacecraft was moving. The cameras each had a 98 kilometers (61 miles) square viewing range, and combined the range was 185 km (115 miles). The cameras contained an optical lens, RBV sensor, thermoelectric cooler, deflection and focus coils, a mechanical shutter, and erase lamps. Landsat 3's RBV had a resolution of 40 meters (130 ft), which was twice the resolution of Landsat 1's 80 m (260 ft).

== Mission ==
=== Launch ===
The 960 kilograms (2,120 lb) Landsat 3 was launched from Vandenberg Air Force Base, California on March 5, 1978. It was placed into a Sun-synchronous, near polar orbit at an inclination of 99.1 degrees and an altitude of 570 miles (920 km). Landsat 3 completed 14 orbits of the Earth daily, and its cycle repeated every 18 days.

=== Operations ===
Landsat 3's MSS had five spectral bands, but one failed shortly after launch. The satellite was placed in standby mode on March 31, 1983. Landsat 3 was decommissioned on September 7, 1983.

== Results ==
The data from Landsat 3 was used by over 400 programs in 31 countries. Countries that could not afford their own satellite used the data to discover and monitor resources that they would have not been capable of otherwise. For example, Bolivia spent $10,000 on data which was used to discover vast lithium deposits, while United States companies have invested more than $136 million for further exploration. Kenya used the data to monitor grazing conditions and to help lion and cheetah preservation efforts, and Pakistan used the data to decide where to dredge the river delta to build a new port.

Specific locations for Landsat 3's data can be found by using the World Reference System (WRS). To find any specific location on Earth, a row and path number are required; for example, Row 60 is at the equator. Landsat 1-3 use WRS-1, but Landsats 4 and after used WRS-2.
