= NOAA-4 =

American weather satellite

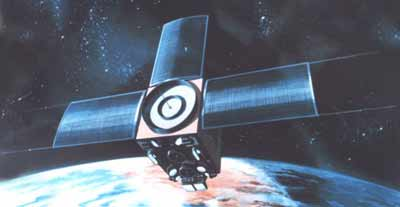
- Illustration of the NOAA 4 (ITOS G) satellite
- Mission type: Weather
- Operator: NOAA / NASA
- COSPAR ID: 1974-089A
- SATCAT no.: 7529
- Mission duration: 4 years

Spacecraft properties
- Launch mass: 339.7 kilograms (749 lb)

Start of mission
- Launch date: November 15, 1974, 17:11:00 UTC
- Rocket: Delta 2310 D104
- Launch site: Vandenberg SLC-2W

End of mission
- Disposal: Decommissioned
- Deactivated: November 18, 1978

Orbital parameters
- Reference system: Geocentric
- Regime: Sun-synchronous
- Perigee altitude: 1,451 kilometers (902 mi)
- Apogee altitude: 1,465 kilometers (910 mi)
- Inclination: 101.46 degrees
- Period: 114.91 minutes
- Epoch: December 8, 2013, 12:44:30 UTC

Instruments
- VHRR, VTPR, SR

NOAA-4, also known as ITOS-G, was a weather satellite operated by the National Oceanic and Atmospheric Administration (NOAA). It was part of a series of satellites called ITOS, or improved TIROS.

NOAA-4 images of cyclone Tracy

NOAA-4 was launched on a Delta rocket on November 15, 1974. The launch carried two other satellites: AMSAT-OSCAR 7 and Intasat.

It remained operational for 1463 days until it was deactivated by NOAA on November 18, 1978.
