= Intasat =

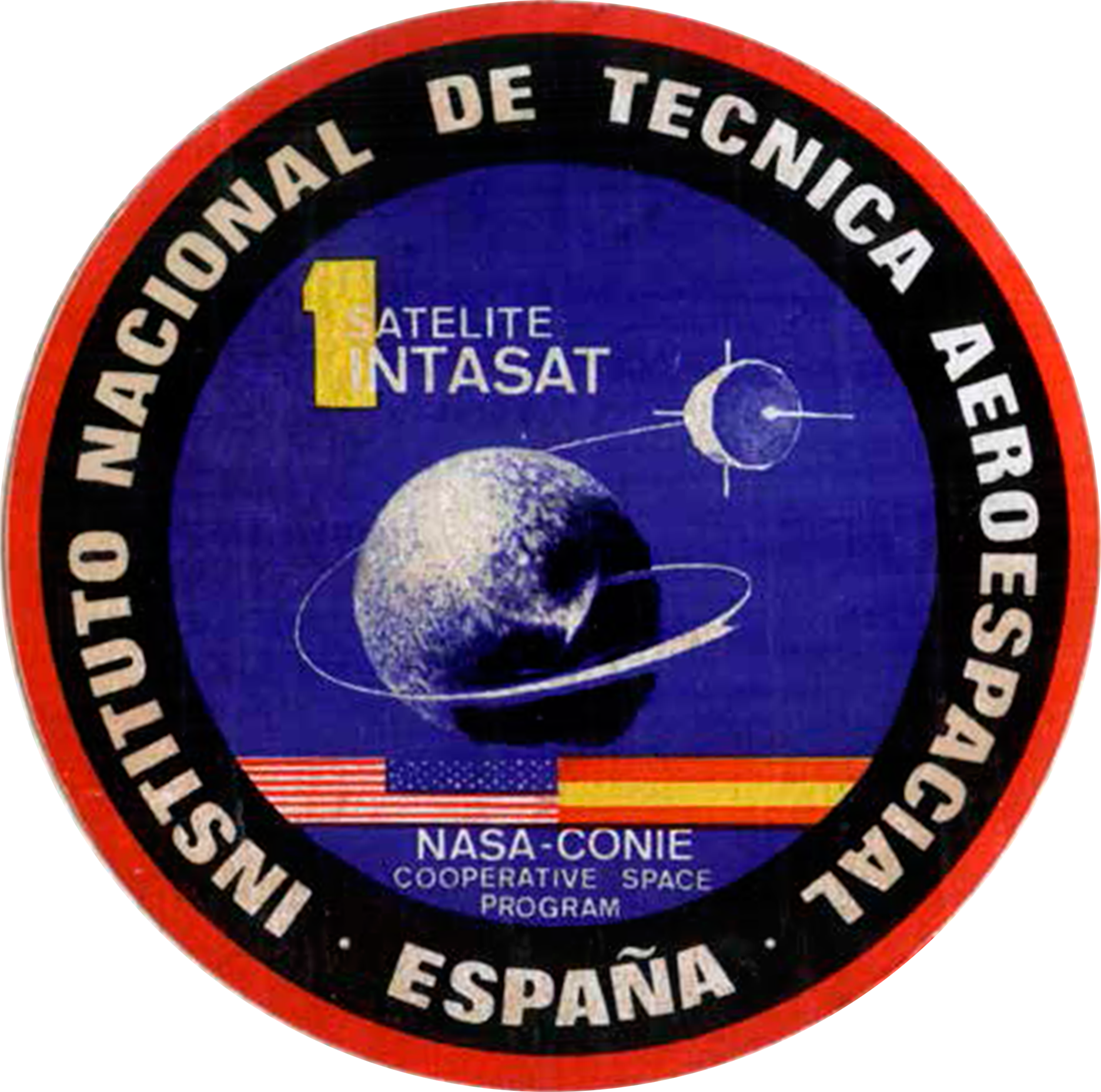
insignia

INTASAT (COSPAR 1974-089C, SATCAT 07531) was the first satellite of Spain. It was designed by Spain's National Institute of Aerospace Technology (INTA).

INTASAT was launched on November 15, 1974, atop a NASA Delta rocket from Vandenberg Air Force Base. With a mass of 20.4 kg, it was launched piggyback with two other satellites, ITOS-G and AMSAT-OSCAR 7. It had a lifespan of two years, and carried a beacon experiment to study the ionosphere.

== Background ==
The project started in 1968 from an initiative of the National Institute for Aerospace Technology. The participants in the project, besides INTA, were Hawker Siddeley Dynamics (HSD) and Standard Electrica SA (project manager from Spain), Jose Luis Sagredo (responsible for the Beacon Experiment and Ionospheric), and Jose Maria Dorado (responsible for the other areas).
