= Explorer 43 =

NASA satellite of the Explorer program

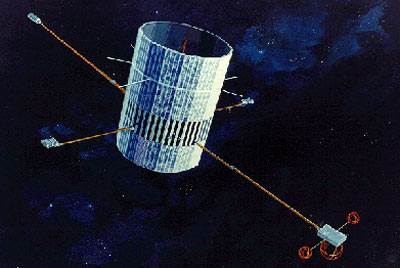
- Explorer 43 satellite in space
- Names: IMP-I; IMP-6; Interplanetary Monitoring Platform-6
- Mission type: Space physics
- Operator: NASA
- COSPAR ID: 1971-019A
- SATCAT no.: 05043
- Mission duration: 3.5 years (achieved)

Spacecraft properties
- Spacecraft: Explorer XLIII
- Spacecraft type: Interplanetary Monitoring Platform
- Bus: IMP
- Manufacturer: Goddard Space Flight Center
- Launch mass: 635 kg (1,400 lb)
- Dimensions: 135.64 cm (53.40 in) in diameter by 182.12 cm (71.70 in) high

Start of mission
- Launch date: 13 March 1971, 16:15:00 GMT
- Rocket: Thor-Delta M6 (Thor 562 / Delta 083)
- Launch site: Cape Canaveral, LC-17A
- Contractor: Douglas Aircraft Company
- Entered service: 13 March 1971

End of mission
- Decay date: 2 October 1974

Orbital parameters
- Reference system: Geocentric orbit
- Regime: Highly elliptical orbit
- Perigee altitude: 242 km (150 mi)
- Apogee altitude: 196,574 km (122,145 mi)
- Inclination: 28.70°
- Period: 5626.00 minutes

Instruments
Instruments
- Electrostatic Fields
- Electrostatic Waves and Radio Noise (Project)
- Electrostatic Waves and Radio Noise -- GSFC
- Electrostatic Waves and Radio Noise -- Iowa
- Electrostatic Waves and Radio Noise -- Minnesota
- Interplanetary Long Wavelength Radio Astronomy Experiment -- Time Resolution
- Interplanetary Long-Wavelength Radio Astronomy Experiment -- Flux Resolution
- Low-Energy Protons and Electrons
- Measurement of Magnetic Fields
- Measurement of Solar Plasma
- Measurement of Solar Plasma 2
- Medium-Energy Solar Protons and Electrons
- Nuclear Composition of Cosmic and Solar Particle Radiations
- Radio Astronomy (Project)
- Solar and Galactic Cosmic-Ray Studies
- Solar Proton Monitoring Experiment
- Study of Cosmic Ray, Solar, and Magnetospheric Electrons

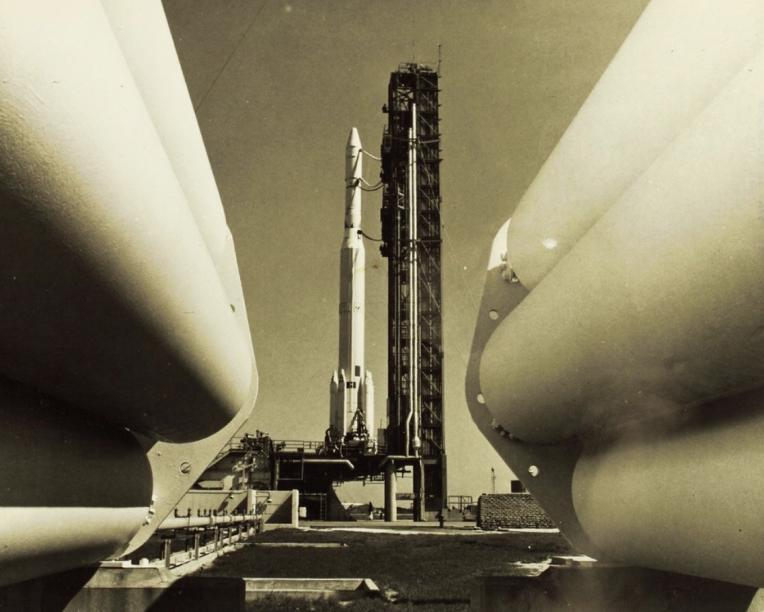
Delta M6 rocket with Explorer 43 at LC-17A

Explorer 43, also called IMP-I and IMP-6, was a NASA satellite launched as part of the Explorers program. Explorer 43 was launched on 13 March 1971 from Cape Canaveral Air Force Station (CCAFS) with a Thor-Delta M6 launch vehicle. Explorer 43 was the sixth satellite of the Interplanetary Monitoring Platform.

== Spacecraft and mission ==
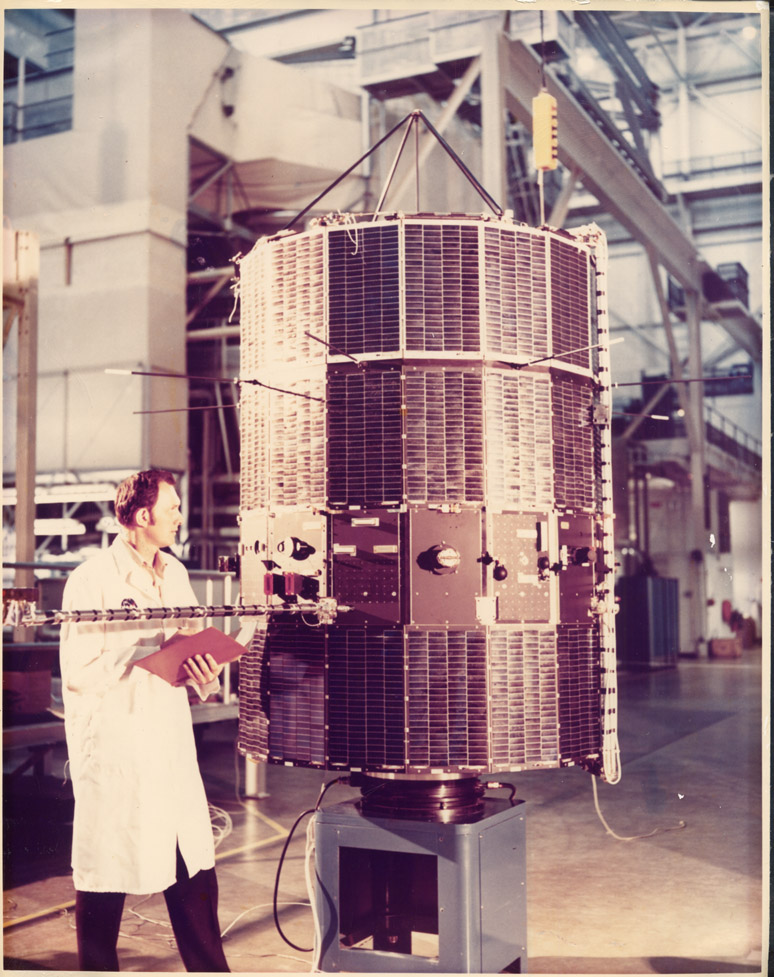
Explorer 43 satellite

Explorer 43 continued the study, begun by earlier IMPs, of the interplanetary and outer magnetospheric regions by measuring energetic particles, plasma, electric fields and magnetic fields. Its orbit took it to cislunar space during a period of decreasing solar activity.

A Radio astronomy experiment was also included in the spacecraft payload. The 16-sided spacecraft was 182.12 cm (71.70 in) high by 135.64 cm (53.40 in) in diameter. The spacecraft spin axis was normal to the ecliptic plane, and its spin rate was 5 rpm, with propulsion Star-17A. The initial apogee point lay near the Earth-Sun line. The solar-cell and chemical-battery powered spacecraft carried 2 transmitters. One continuously transmitted PCM encoder data at a 1600 bit/s information bit rate.

The second transmitter was used for transmission of Very low frequency (VLF) data and for ranging information. Three orthogonal pairs of dipole antennas were used for the electric fields experiments, and one of these pairs was also used for the Radio astronomy experiment. The members of the antenna pair along the spacecraft spin axis extended 2.9 m (9 ft 6 in), the members of the pair used in both the electric field and radio astronomy experiments extended 45.5 m (149 ft), and the members of the third pair were slightly unbalanced, extending 24.4 × 27.6 m (80 × 91 ft), respectively. All four elements perpendicular to the spin axis were to have extended 45.5 m (149 ft).

== Experiments ==
=== Electrostatic Fields ===
Two dipole antennas were mounted orthogonally in the spin plane of the spacecraft while a third dipole antenna was mounted along the spacecraft spin axis. Antenna element lengths were -X, 27.6 m (91 ft); +X, 24.4 m (80 ft); -Y and +Y, 45.5 m (149 ft); -Z and +Z (spin axis), 2.9 m (9 ft 6 in). Electrometers measured the analog potential difference between the elements in each pair of antennas simultaneously every 5.12 s. The potential differences were sampled digitally through a 14-bit analog/digital converter every 0.64-seconds. The DC sensitivity was 100 microvolts per meter.

=== Electrostatic Waves and Radio Noise -- Project ===
This experiment, as originally defined by NASA Headquarters, has been separated at NSSDC into its Iowa (71-019A-03), Minnesota (71-019A-12), and GSFC (71-019A-16) components. Initial experiment performance was normal.

=== Electrostatic Waves and Radio Noise -- GSFC ===
The AC electric field intensity in 12 narrow channels was measured from 0.1 to 100-Hz. The experiment had an optimum noise threshold of 10 microvolts per meter. Each channel was sampled once every 5.12-seconds at the high bit rate. The antennas used in the dc field experiment (71-019A-02) were also utilized in this experiment.

=== Electrostatic Waves and Radio Noise -- Iowa ===
Three orthogonal loop antennas and the three orthogonal (nearly balanced) dipoles gained simultaneous E and B field data in 16 logarithmically equispaced narrow channels from 20-Hz to 200-kHz. These detectors were also used in the dc electric field (71-019A-02) experiment. The spectral frequency resolution was about 30%. Each E-B channel was sampled every 5.12-seconds. A short back-up dipole antenna (about 1 m (3 ft 3 in) tip to tip) was also used to detect very short wavelength plasma phenomena. Analog B or E data from 0 to 30-kHz in three segments were also telemetered on the special purpose 4-watts analog channel. This experiment was designed to be used in conjunction with the low-energy proton and electron differential energy analyzer (LEPEDEA).

=== Electrostatic Waves and Radio Noise -- Minnesota ===
This experiment was designed to determine the polarization, direction of propagation, flux, and direction of the wave normal surface for plasma waves. The time-averaged correlation at one channel frequency from any combination of the six antenna elements could be simultaneously calculated by six onboard analog computers. There were 64 logarithmically equispaced frequency channels centered from 23-Hz to 200-kHz with a 15% bandwidth at 3-dB. Averaging time was 2.5-seconds at the high bit rate. The combinations of elements and the sequence of frequencies to be measured were controlled either by an onboard computer or from the ground.

=== Interplanetary Long Wavelength Radio Astronomy Experiment -- Time Resolution ===
This experiment was designed to study the radio spectra of the galaxy, the Sun, and Jupiter with relatively high time resolution. Two stepped-frequency radiometers, attached to a single 91 m (299 ft) dipole antenna (also used in the electric field experiments), stepped through the frequency range of 30-kHz to 2-MHz in 32 steps.

=== Interplanetary Long-Wavelength Radio Astronomy Experiment -- Flux Resolution ===
The objective of this experiment was to study the spectra of the galaxy, the sun, and Jupiter with high flux resolution (about 1%). A radiometer, operating in either a stepping mode (eight frequencies) or at a single frequency, was connected to a 91 m (299 ft) dipole antenna, which was also used in the electric field experiments. The frequency range covered was 0.05 to 3.5-MHz.

=== Low-Energy Protons and Electrons ===
This experiment was designed to conduct comprehensive observations of the differential energy spectra, angular distributions, spatial distributions and temporal variations of electrons and protons over the geocentric radial distance range from 1.03 to 30 Earth radii. Two arrays of curved-plate cylindrical electrostatic analyzers and continuous channel multipliers were used for this purpose. One analyzer, the LEPEDEA (low-energy proton and electron differential energy analyzer), was to measure the energy spectra and angular distribution of protons and electrons separately in the energy range 24 eV to 50 keV (16 energy intervals for protons and electrons separately). The other analyzer, the LEPEDEA (low energy proton differential energy analyzer) measured the energy spectra and angular distribution of protons in the energy range 1.7 to 550 eV (eight energy intervals). The analyzers were mounted perpendicular to the spacecraft spin axis. An EON type 213 Geiger–Müller counter, whose collimated field of view of 15° half angle was oriented approximately parallel to that of the LEPEDEA, was used to measure the intensity of electrons of energies greater than 45 keV and protons of energies greater than 500 keV and to provide background measurements for the LEPDEA. One continuous channel electron multiplier failed on 10 August 1974, so that no useful electron data were collected for the last 7 weeks of the spacecraft life. Otherwise, the experiment functioned normally over the spacecraft lifetime.

=== Measurement of Magnetic Fields ===
This experiment was designed to measure accurately the vector magnetic field in the interplanetary medium and in the Earth's magnetosphere, magnetotail, and magnetosheath. The detector was a boom-mounted triaxial fluxgate magnetometer with four ranges: ± 16, 48, 144, and 432 nT, respectively. Corresponding sensitivities were ± 0.06, 0.19, 0.56, and 1.69 nT, respectively. Automatic range selection capability was included. A flipping mechanism permitted inflight calibration of the three sensor zero levels. The vector sampling rate was 12.5 samples per second. The experiment functioned normally through the spacecraft life.

=== Measurement of Solar Plasma ===
A hemispherical electrostatic analyzer was used to extend descriptions of the particle (electron and positive ion) populations in the solar wind, magnetosheath, and magnetotail. Energy spectral analysis was accomplished by charging the plates to known voltage levels and allowing them to discharge with known RC time constants. The analyzer had four commandable modes. The first mode was designed for the measurement of solar wind protons and alpha particles. During eight spacecraft revolutions, 32-level energy spectra were obtained in eight angular ranges centered on the sun. The energy levels extended from 100 eV to 8 keV. The second mode was designed for the measurement of solar wind heavy ions. This cycle was the same as the first except that the energy per charge levels were limited to 900 eV to 8 keV, and the efficiency of counting heavy ions was increased relative to protons and alpha particles. The third mode was designed for the measurement of solar wind and magnetosheath electrons and magnetosheath positive ions. This was a combination cycle in which electron and positive ion spectral sweeps were alternated. During a cycle of nine spacecraft revolutions, eight electron spectra and eight positive ion spectra were obtained. The combined data for electrons in this mode consisted of 16-level energy spectra taken in 32 evenly spaced angular ranges. The spectra extended from 4 to 1000 eV. The data for positive ions consisted of 32-level spectra taken in the same 32 angular ranges. The energy per charge spectra extended from 100 eV to 8 keV. The fourth mode was designed for magnetotail electrons and positive ions. Electrons and positive ions were studied with 16-level spectra in 32 evenly-spaced angular ranges for both electrons and positive ions. The energy per charge ranges were 6 eV to 24 keV for electrons and 45 eV to 34 keV for positive ions.

=== Measurement of Solar Plasma 2 ===
This experiment consisted of two oppositely directed plasma detectors, both of which were normal to the spacecraft spin axis. An electrostatic analyzer measured protons and alpha particles with deflection voltages between 170 and 6400 volts. An electrostatic analyzer and velocity selector measured only alpha particles with deflection voltages between 640 and 7200 volts. During successive spacecraft revolutions, each of the two electrostatic analyzer deflection voltages was advanced through one of 20 logarithmically equispaced steps in the above stated intervals. Complete spectra were thus obtained in 240-seconds. Experiment performance was normal for the first month. A short circuit in the high-voltage portion caused the experiment to fail.

=== Medium-Energy Solar Protons and Electrons ===
This experiment, which was used to study the acceleration of electrons at the sun and their ejection into interplanetary space, consisted of four detectors. Two of these were Geiger–Müller tubes (GM) with viewing directions of 170° with respect to the spacecraft spin axis. One tube responded to electrons with energies greater than 20-keV that were backscattered off a gold foil. The 20-keV electron data were accumulated and read out every 10.24-seconds. The other GM tube directly observed electrons and protons with energies greater than 18- and 250-keV, respectively. This type of data was accumulated and read out every 5.12-seconds. The third detector, a telescope consisting of three semiconductors, had a viewing direction of 170° with respect to the spacecraft spin axis. This detector responded to electrons and protons in the energy intervals 18- to 450-keV and 0.04- to 2-MeV, respectively. Electron data from this detector were accumulated in four contiguous logarithmically equispaced energy channels for 5.12-seconds and read out at the end of each time interval. In addition, a 64-channel, pulse-height analysis was performed on the detector counts, and this information was telemetered every 163.84-seconds. Proton data from this detector was accumulated and read out every 20.48-seconds. The fourth detector consisted of two semiconductors with a viewing direction perpendicular to the spacecraft spin axis. This detector responded to electrons with energies between 47- and 350-keV that were backscattered off a gold foil. Counts of 47- to 350-keV electrons and 80- to 350-keV electrons were accumulated in each of 16 and 4 equiangular sectors, respectively, during successive 20.48-seconds intervals, and they were read out at the end of each interval. The experiment functioned normally.

=== Nuclear Composition of Cosmic and Solar Particle Radiations ===
This experiment was designed to measure the spectra and composition of solar and galactic cosmic rays and of magnetotail particles, to serve as a prototype of instruments to be flown on the deep space probes Pioneer 10 and 11, and to provide reference 1-AU data for comparison with the Pioneer data in gradient studies. The experiment consisted of a composition telescope (which failed approximately 10 days after launch), a second telescope (from which virtually all the useful data of this experiment were obtained), an electron current detector (electrons above 1.8-MeV plus protons above 21-MeV), and a fission cell (protons above 120-MeV). The latter two instruments were specifically included as prototypes of Pioneer instruments designed to measure very high fluxes of Jovian trapped particles. As such they were not optimized for measurements of the relatively low fluxes in the Earth's radiation belt. The successful telescope consisted of six colinear sensors (five lithium-drifted silicon sensors and one CsI (Tl) scintillator) and an anticoincidence scintillator. This telescope had a look direction that was normal to the spacecraft spin axis and had an angular aperture between 48° and 64° (depending on coincidence mode considered). Coincidence mode rates (5.12-seconds accumulations, corresponding to protons in the ranges 0.5 to 10.6, 10.6 to 19.6, 29.3 to 66.7 and above 66.7-MeV) were obtained each 10.24-seconds. Pulse-height analysis (one event every 20.48-seconds) was used with these rates to study charge composition (up to Z of 8), isotopic composition (for Z of 1 and 2), and electron fluxes. The spacecraft onboard computer was used to permit some of the objectives assigned to the composition telescope to be achieved through the smaller successful telescope. Except for the failure of the composition telescope, the experiment worked as planned throughout the spacecraft life.

=== Radio Astronomy (Project) ===
This experiment, as originally defined by NASA headquarters, has been separated at NSSDC into its Michigan (71-019A-13) and GSFC (71-019A-15) components. Initial experiment performance was normal.

=== Solar and Galactic Cosmic-Ray Studies ===
The GSFC cosmic-ray experiment was designed to measure energy spectra, composition, and angular distributions of solar and galactic electrons, protons, and heavier nuclei up to Z=26. Three distinct detector systems were used. The first system consisted of four essentially identical solid-state telescopes. Two were perpendicular and two were parallel to the spacecraft spin axis. Because the telescopes differed in their absorbing thicknesses, some discrimination between electrons and protons was possible. Each detector responded to particles between about 50-keV and 2-MeV. A seven-level integral analyzer was included for spectral information. The second detector system was a solid-state dE/dx vs E telescope that looked perpendicular to the spin axis. This telescope measured Z=1 to 16 nuclei with energies between 4- and 20-MeV/nucleon. Counts of particles in the 0.5-to 4-MeV/nucleon range, with no charge resolution, were obtained as counts in the dE/dx, but not in the E, sensor. The third detector system was a three-element telescope whose axis made an angle of 39 deg with respect to the spin axis. The instrument responded to electrons between 2- and 12-MeV and Z=1 to 30 nuclei in the energy range 20- to 500-MeV/nucleon. For particles below 80-MeV, this instrument acted as a dE/dx vs E detector. Above 80-MeV, it acted as a bidirectional triple dE/dx vs E detector. By use of a combination of pulse-height analysis and gain switching, the output of each sensor of the second and third detector systems was sorted into one of 1000 and 1200 energy channels, respectively. Flux directionality information was obtained by dividing certain portions of the data from each detector into eight angular sectors. The second detector system performed normally from launch until 14 October 1971 (apogee shadow), after which problems were encountered. Essentially no data were obtained from this telescope after November 1971. Otherwise, the experiment functioned normally through the spacecraft life.

=== Solar Proton Monitoring Experiment ===
The solar proton monitoring experiment consisted of five separate detectors, each using one or more solid-state detector elements. Three detectors, each with a 2-pi-sr field of view and a 5.12-seconds accumulation time, measured protons with energies greater than 10-, 30-, and 60-MeV. Resultant hourly averaged fluxes were published on a rapid basis in "Solar-Geophysical Data". The fourth detector, a two-element telescope, measured directional fluxes of protons in the energy intervals from 0.2 to 0.5, 0.5 to 2.0, and 2.0 to 7.5-MeV and directional fluxes of alpha particles in the energy interval from 8 to 20-MeV. The fifth detector measured directional fluxes of electrons above 10-keV. For the last two detectors, counts were obtained in 45° sectors as the spacecraft spun. Onboard calibration capability for the first four detectors was included.

=== Study of Cosmic Ray, Solar, and Magnetospheric Electrons ===
This experiment was designed to study galactic and solar electrons and positrons in the kinetic energy range 100-keV to 1.5-MeV. Information on protons between 0.5- and 4.0-MeV was also obtained. A collimated stilbene crystal scintillator looking perpendicular to the spacecraft spin axis was the principal detector. A similar, fully shielded crystal served to determine the contribution to the principal detector count rate of electrons and protons generated within the principal detector by gamma rays and neutrons, respectively. A fully shielded CsI crystal served as a gamma-ray spectrometer and was used in coincidence with the principal detector to distinguish electrons from positrons. Count rates from each detector obtained in eight angular sectors per revolution were telemetered. In addition, the amplitude and shape of the pulse generated in the principal detector by the first stopping particle in each appropriate telemetry frame were studied. Pulse amplitude and shape yielded energy (10% resolution) and particle species information. Initial experiment performance was normal. An experiment malfunction prevented the acquisition of useful data between the 7th and 12th weeks after launch. Marginal operation of part of the apparatus made it difficult to determine positron to electron ratios. Otherwise, the instrument performance was normal until 26 September 1972, when the experiment could not be turned on after a 4-hour spacecraft turnoff.

== End of mission ==
The spacecraft reentered the Earth's atmosphere on 2 October 1974, after a highly successful mission.

== See also ==
- Explorers program
