= Delta E =

American expendable launch vehicle

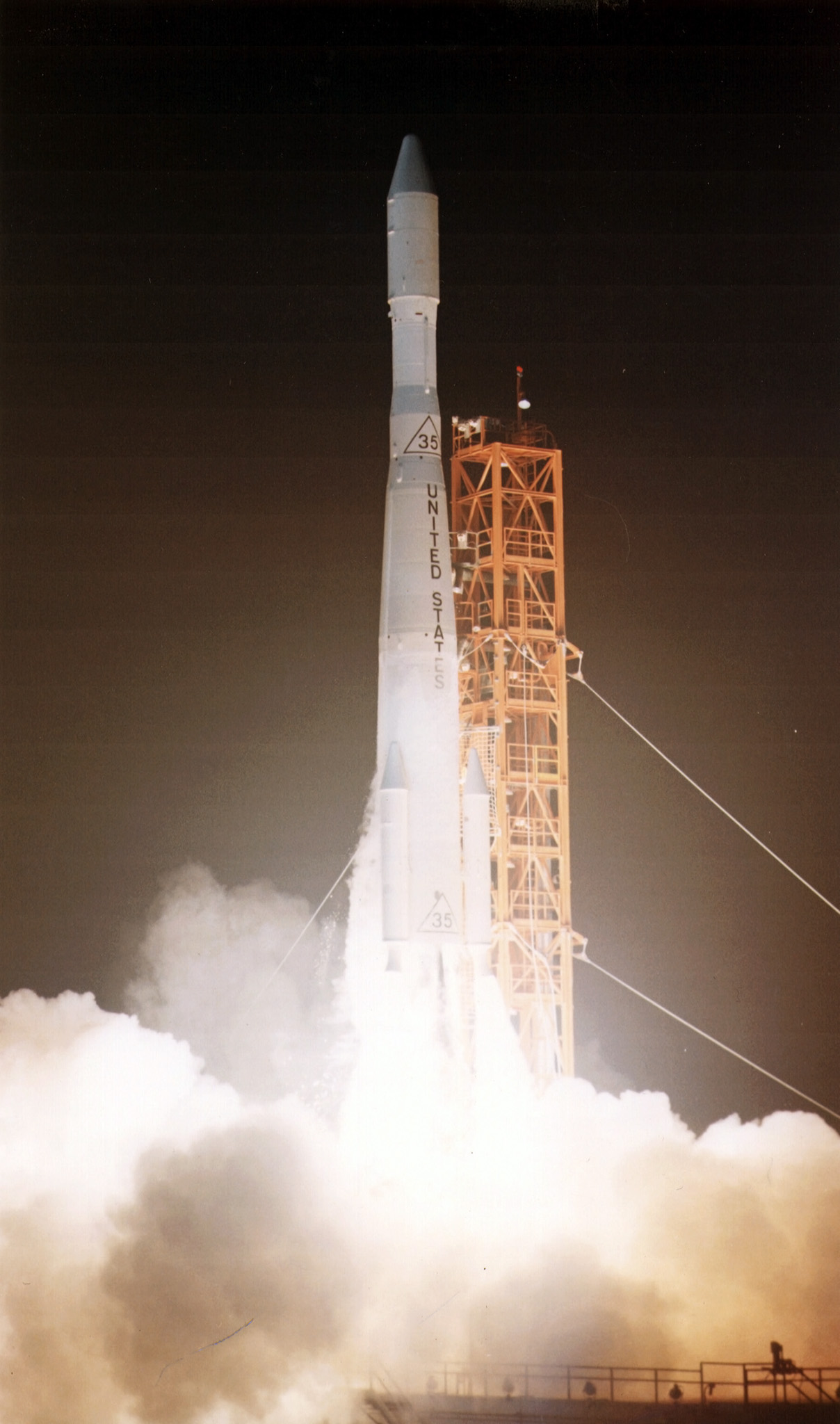
- Launch of a Delta E with Pioneer 6
- Function: Expendable launch system
- Country of origin: United States

Launch history
- Status: Retired
- Launch sites: Cape Canaveral LC-17; Vandenberg SLC-2E
- Total launches: 23
- Success(es): 23
- First flight: 6 November 1965
- Last flight: 1 April 1971

The Delta E, or Thor-Delta E was an American expendable launch system used for twenty-three orbital launches between 1965 and 1971. It was a member of the Delta family of rockets.

The first stage was a Thor missile in the DSV-2C configuration, and the second stage was the Delta-E, which was derived from the earlier Delta-A. Three Castor-1 solid rocket boosters were clustered around the first stage. Two different solid-fuel upper stages were available; an Altair-2 was used on the baseline version, however this could be replaced with an FW-4D to increase performance. A Delta E with the FW-4D upper stage was designated Delta E1. Six flights used the Delta E configuration and seventeen used the Delta E1.

Delta E rockets were launched from Cape Canaveral Air Force Station Launch Complex 17 and Vandenberg Air Force Base Space Launch Complex 2E. All 23 flights were successful. On December 16 1965, a Delta E launched the Pioneer 6 space probe.
