= Landsat 2 =

American earth observation satellite (1975–1982)

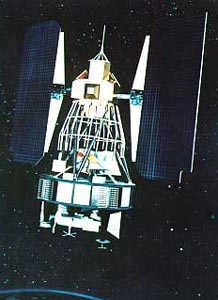
- Artist's rendering of Landsat 1 (very similar to Landsat 2)
- Mission type: Earth imaging
- Operator: NASA / NOAA
- COSPAR ID: 1975-004A
- SATCAT no.: 07615
- Mission duration: 7 years, 1 month, 3 days

Spacecraft properties
- Bus: Nimbus
- Manufacturer: General Electric
- Launch mass: 953 kg (2,101 lb)

Start of mission
- Launch date: 22 January 1975, 17:56 UTC
- Rocket: Delta 2910
- Launch site: Vandenberg AFB SLC-2W

End of mission
- Disposal: Decommissioned
- Deactivated: 25 February 1982

Orbital parameters
- Reference system: Geocentric
- Regime: Sun-synchronous
- Semi-major axis: 7,283.0 km (4,525.4 mi)
- Eccentricity: 0.0008709
- Perigee altitude: 906.3 km (563.1 mi)
- Apogee altitude: 919.0 km (571.0 mi)
- Inclination: 98.9 degrees
- Period: 103.18 minutes
- RAAN: 192.8963°
- Mean anomaly: 345.3381°
- Epoch: 28 May 2016

Landsat 2 is the second satellite of the Landsat program. The spacecraft originally carried a designation of ERTS-B (Earth Resource Technology Satellite B) but was renamed "Landsat 2" prior to its launch on January 22, 1975. The objective of the satellite was to acquire global, seasonal data in medium resolution from a near-polar, Sun-synchronous orbit. The satellite, built by General Electric, acquired data with the Return Beam Vidicon (RBV) and the Multispectral Scanner (MSS). Despite having a design life of one year, Landsat 2 operated for over seven years, finally ceasing operations on February 25, 1982.

== Background ==
Landsat 2 (originally designated ERTS-B) was the second Landsat satellite launched. The first, Landsat 1 (originally designated ERTA-1), took and transmitted over 100,000 photos from the two-and-a-half years between the two satellites' launches.

== Satellite design ==
=== Development ===
Landsat 2 was manufactured by General Electric's Space Division in Valley Forge, Pennsylvania. This satellite was considered an experiment, unlike Landsat 1. Landsat 2 was originally designated as ERTS-B (Earth Resources Technology Satellite-B) and was renamed prior to launch. The satellite was designed to operate for a minimum of one year. The primary objective of the MSS was to acquire global, seasonal data in medium resolution from a near-polar, sun-synchronous orbit. NASA administrator James C. Fletcher said, "If I had to pick one spacecraft, one space-age development to save the world, I would pick ERTS and the satellites which I believe will be evolved from it later in this decade."

=== Operation ===
The spacecraft was 3 meters (9.8 ft) tall with a 1.5 m (4.9 ft) diameter. Two solar panel arrays that were 4 m (13 ft) long each, with single axis articulation, generated power for the spacecraft. Landsat 2 had a liftoff weight of 953 kilograms (2,101 lb).

The attitude was controlled with three hydrazine thrusters. The satellite transmitted data back to the ground with S-Band and very high frequency (VHF) transmitters, at a rate of 15 Mbit/s and 6-bit quantization. The satellite had three-axis fine attitude control with four wheels, which gave it +/- 0.7 degrees of control. The attitude control system also used horizon scanners, Sun sensors, and a command antenna. A freon gas propulsion system allowed the satellite to make fine attitude adjustments. Landsat 2 could store 30 minutes' worth of data on two wide-band video tape recorders.

=== Sensors ===
As in the case of its predecessor Landsat 1, the satellite's payload included two remote sensing instruments, the Return Beam Vidicon (RBV) and the Multispectral Scanner (MSS). The specifications for these instruments were identical to those of the instruments carried on Landsat 1. The data acquired by the MSS was considered more scientifically useful than the data returned from the RBV, which was rarely used and considered only for engineering evaluation purposes.

The MSS, built by Hughes Aircraft Corporation, was capable of detecting four different spectral bands: band 4 visible green, band 5 visible red, band 6 near infrared, and band 7 near infrared. Each spectral band had different scientific uses. Band 4 primarily investigated areas of water, with the ability to detect sediment laden areas and areas of shallow water. Band 5 was primarily used to identify cultural features. Band 6 sensed the vegetation boundaries between land, water, and landforms. Band 7 was the most proficient at sensing through atmospheric haze, and identified water and land boundaries, vegetation, and landforms. The scene size for the scanners of the MSS was 170 kilometers (110 mi) to 185 km (115 mi), which is the area the sensors could survey per scan. The ground sampling interval of the MSS was 57 m (187 ft) to 79 m (259 ft), which is medium resolution.

With its three cameras, the RBV was capable of acquiring 3.5 MHz video with 80 m (260 ft) resolution in three spectral bands: blue to green (475–575 nm), orange to red (580–680 nm), and red to near infrared (690–820 nm). Besides engineering evaluation purposes, the primary use of the RBV was for cartography of remote areas.

== Mission ==
=== Launch ===
Landsat 2 was originally set to launch on January 19, 1975, but an electrical problem with the launch vehicle caused the launch to be postponed. Landsat 2 was launched January 22, 1975 on a Delta 2910 out of Vandenberg Air Force Base in California. The satellite was placed in a sun-synchronous, near-polar orbit with an inclination of 99.2 degrees and an altitude of 917 km (570 mi). Landsat 2 orbited Earth every 103 minutes, totaling 14 times per day. The orbital cycle of the satellite was repeated every 18 days.

=== Operations ===
Landsat 2 transmitted its data to several international ground stations. The ground stations were located on six of the seven continents, with the first beginning operations in April 1975 in Prince Albert, Canada, and the last to begin operations in December 1981 in Hartebeesthoek, South Africa.

The satellite continued operations until February 25, 1982, when it was removed from operations due to a faulty yaw control thruster. The satellite was placed in standby mode on March 31, 1983.

== Results ==
Data received from the satellite is free to the public. There are multiple levels of data available. Level-1 data takes 1–3 days to process, and the user will receive multiple files that they can then piece together to generate an RGB image. Higher level science data can also be requested, which contains data such as surface reflectance.

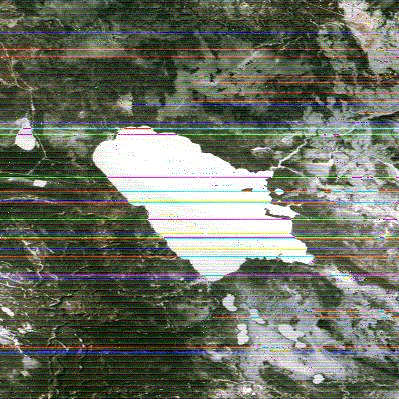
This image from the Landsat 2 satellite experienced a data anomaly known as transmission striping

Although the MSS was the most useful instrument on Landsat 2, sometimes the data recorded was anomalous. The U.S. Geological Survey (USGS) would identify these anomalies and document them. Known issues on the MSS are: banding, coherent noise, data loss, impulse noise, oversaturation, scan correlated shift (SCS), scan mirror pulse, and transmission striping. Transmission striping occurred when data from an individual sensor was lost. Most commonly, multiple data losses occurred simultaneously, resulting in an image with colored bands on it. This form of data anomaly could not be corrected in post processing.
