= Biosatellite 1 =

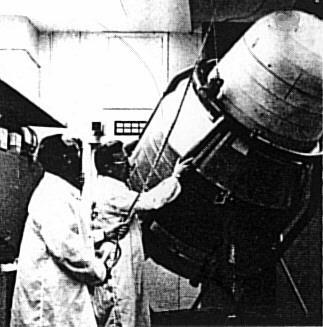
- Biosatellite 1 being prepared by scientists of the mission.
- Mission type: Bioscience
- Operator: NASA / ARC
- COSPAR ID: 1966-114A
- SATCAT no.: 2632
- Mission duration: 30 days

Spacecraft properties
- Manufacturer: General Electric
- Launch mass: 950 kg (2,090 lb)

Start of mission
- Launch date: 14 December 1966, 19:20 UTC
- Rocket: Delta G 471/D43
- Launch site: Cape Canaveral LC-17A

End of mission
- Landing date: 15 February 1967

Orbital parameters
- Reference system: Geocentric
- Regime: Low Earth
- Eccentricity: 0.00105
- Perigee altitude: 295 kilometers (183 mi)
- Apogee altitude: 309 kilometers (192 mi)
- Inclination: 33.5º
- Period: 90.5 minutes
- Epoch: 14 December 1966

Biosatellite 1, also known as Biosat 1 and Biosatellite A, was the first mission in NASA's Biosatellite program. It was launched on December 14, 1966, by a Delta G rocket from Launch Complex 17A of the Cape Canaveral Air Force Station into an orbit with a 296-kilometre (184 mi) perigee, 309-kilometre (192 mi) apogee, and 33.5 degrees of orbital inclination, with a period of 90.5 minutes.

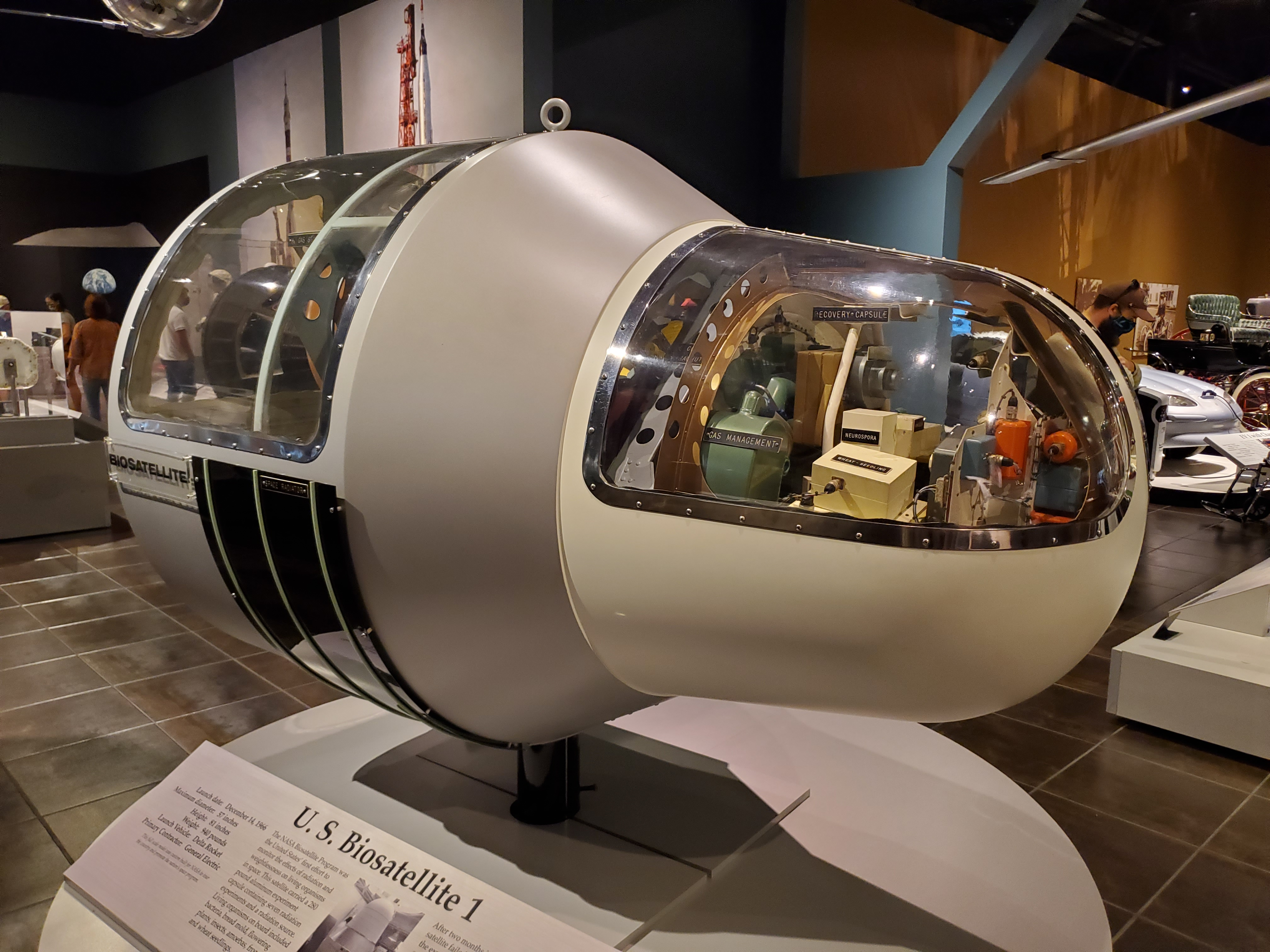
Model of Biosatellite 1 on display at the Tellus Science Museum

Biosatellite 1 was carrying several specimens for studying the effects of the space environment on biological processes. Prior to reentry, the entry capsule separated from the satellite bus properly, but the deorbit motor failed to ignite, leaving it stranded in a slowly decaying orbit. It re-entered and disintegrated on February 15, 1967.

== Experiments ==
- Effects of Weightlessness on Wheat Seedling Morphogenesis and Histochemistry
- Growth Physiology of the Wheat Seedling in Space
- Biochemical Changes in Developing Wheat Seedling in Weightless State
- Effects of Weightlessness of the Dividing Egg of Rana Pipiens
- Mutational Response of Habrobracon
- Liminal Angle of a Plagiogeotropic Organ under Weightlessness
- Effects of Radiation and Weightlessness on Tribolium Pupae
- Effects of Weightlessness on Radiation Induced Somatic Damage in Drosophila
- Effects of Space Environ on Radiation- Induced Damage to Repro Cells of Pupae
- Genetic and Cytologic Studies of Tradescantia Irradiated During Flight
- Combined Effects of Weightlessness and Radiation on Inact.+Mutation-Induct
- Spc Flt Eff-Gamma Rad Interaction on Growth+Induction of Lysogenic Bacteria
- Effects of Weightlessness on Amoeba, Pelomyxa Carolinensis
