= Delta A =

American expendable launch vehicle

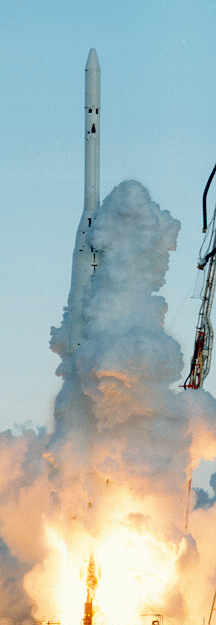
- Delta A launching Explorer 14
- Function: Expendable launch system
- Country of origin: United States

Launch history
- Status: Retired
- Launch sites: Cape Canaveral LC-17
- Total launches: 2
- Success(es): 2
- First flight: 2 October 1962
- Last flight: 27 October 1962

The Delta A, or Thor-Delta A was an American expendable launch system used to launch two Explorer spacecraft in October 1962. A derivative of the Thor-Delta, it was a member of the Delta family of launch vehicles. The Thor-Delta itself was a Thor booster with an Able second stage and Altair third stage.

The first stage was a Thor missile in the DM-21 configuration, and the second stage was the Delta-A, an uprated version of the original Delta. An Altair solid rocket motor was used as a third stage after being tested on the Shotput. Both launches occurred from Cape Canaveral Air Force Station (CCAFS) Launch Complex 17B, and were successful. The first launched Explorer 14, and the second Explorer 15.
