= Solar X-ray Imager =

Solar X-ray Imagers (SXI) are full-disc X-ray instruments observing the Sun aboard GOES satellites. The SXI on GOES 12 was the first of its kind and allows the U.S. NOAA to better monitor and predict space weather.

== Operation ==
The Solar X-ray Imagers aboard the GOES 12, GOES 13, GOES 14, and GOES 15 NOAA weather satellites are used for early detection of solar flares, coronal mass ejections (CMEs), and space phenomena that impact human spaceflight and military and commercial satellite communications. The Solar X-ray Imager was the first X-ray telescope to take a "full-disk" image of the Sun, providing forecasters with the ability to detect solar storms and real-time solar forecasting by the Space Weather Prediction Center (SWPC).

== Imagery ==
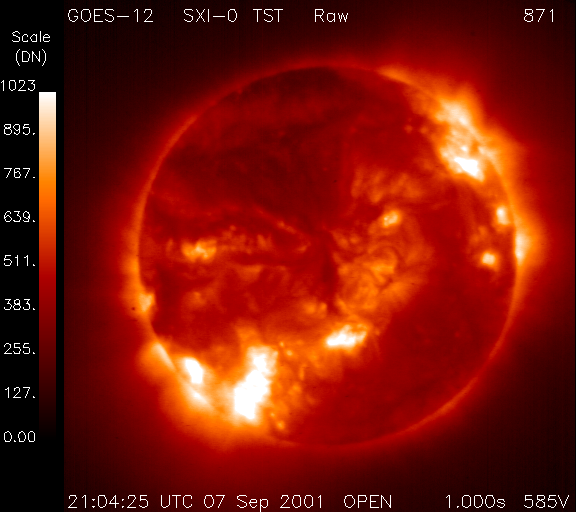
First Image from GOES 12 on 7 September 2001

The SXI aboard GOES 12 is a Wolter Type I (Wolter telescope) grazing incidence X-ray telescope designed to record coronal images in continuous sequence at 1-minute intervals. The Solar X-ray Imager obtains images at multiple wavelengths on the electromagnetic spectrum from 6 to 60 angstrom units (Å). The imagery obtained by the XSI and XRS on GOES 12 allowed forecasters to see space phenomena such as coronal holes, whose geomagnetic and proton storms impact electrical grid systems on Earth, and radio and satellite communications systems.

== Failure and termination of the GOES 12 instrument ==
The XSI and XRS sensors on GOES 12 failed due to a problem with the electrical system which controls the north-south motion of the instruments on April 12, 2007. The SXI and XRS have the ability to capture and record images. Due to limited field of view of the x-ray instrumentation, the XSI and XRS have been permanently deactivated.

== See also ==
- 2001 in spaceflight
- List of GOES satellites
- Geomagnetism
