= GOES 11 =

NOAA weather satellite

GOES-11
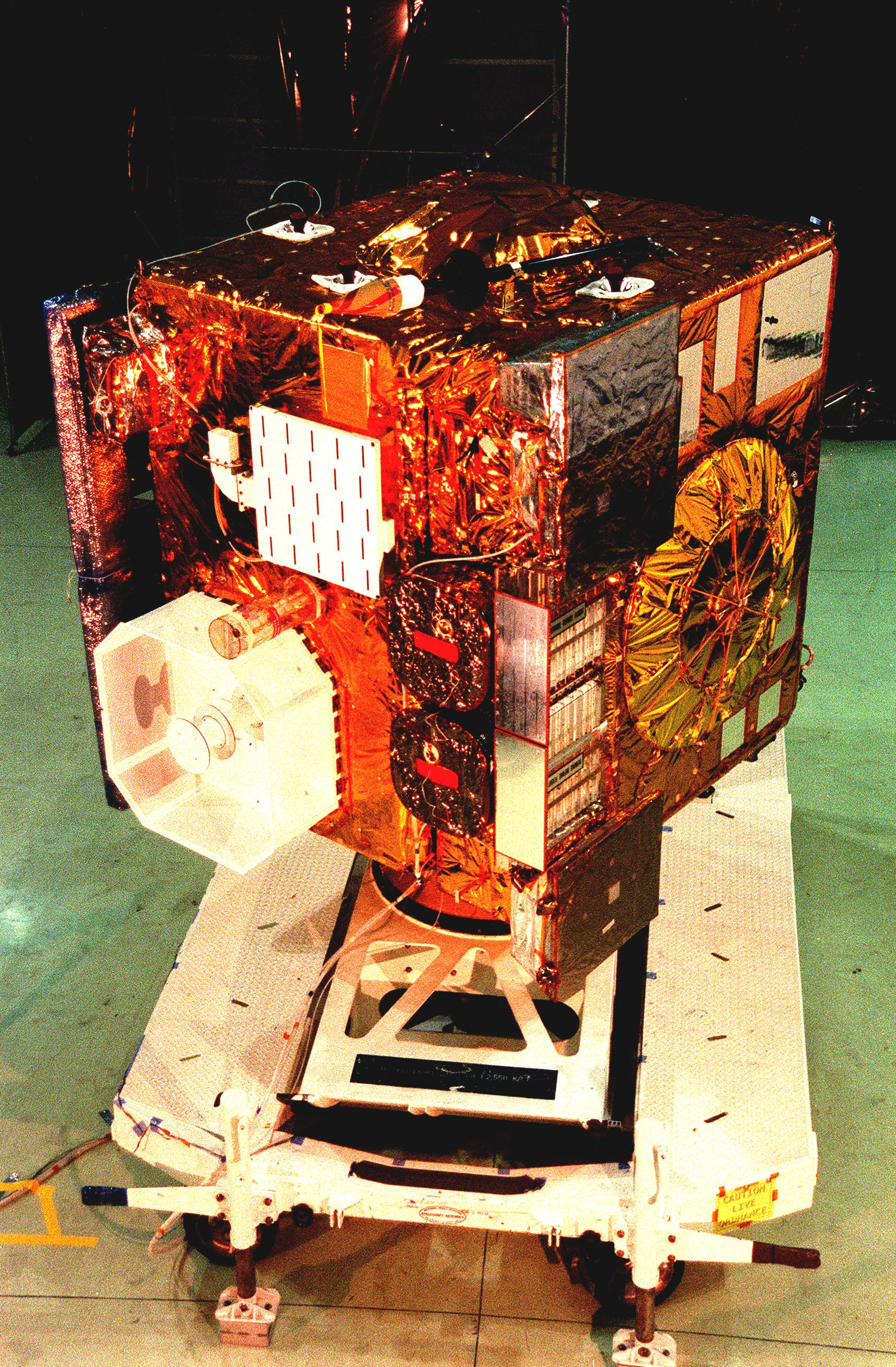
- GOES-L before launch
- Mission type: Weather satellite
- Operator: NOAA / NASA
- COSPAR ID: 2000-022A
- SATCAT no.: 26352
- Mission duration: 5 years (planned); 11 years, 7 months, 3 days (achieved)

Spacecraft properties
- Bus: LS-1300
- Manufacturer: Space Systems/Loral
- Launch mass: 2,217 kilograms (4,888 lb)

Start of mission
- Launch date: 3 May 2000, 07:07 UTC
- Rocket: Atlas IIA
- Launch site: Cape Canaveral SLC-36A
- Contractor: ILS

End of mission
- Disposal: Decommissioned
- Deactivated: 16 December 2011

Orbital parameters
- Reference system: Geocentric
- Regime: Geostationary
- Longitude: 104° West (2000-2006); 135° West (2006-2011)
- Slot: GOES-WEST (2006-2011)
- Semi-major axis: 42,512 kilometres (26,416 mi)
- Perigee altitude: 36,127.7 kilometres (22,448.7 mi)
- Apogee altitude: 36,155.9 kilometres (22,466.2 mi)
- Inclination: 4.2°
- Period: 1,453.9 minutes
- Geostationary Operational Environmental Satellite (Second Generation)

GOES-11, known as GOES-L before becoming operational, is an American weather satellite, which is part of the US National Oceanic and Atmospheric Administration's Geostationary Operational Environmental Satellite system. It was launched in 2000, and operated at the GOES-WEST position, providing coverage of the west coast of the United States until providing its last image on December 6, 2011, and being decommissioned on December 16, 2011.

== Launch ==
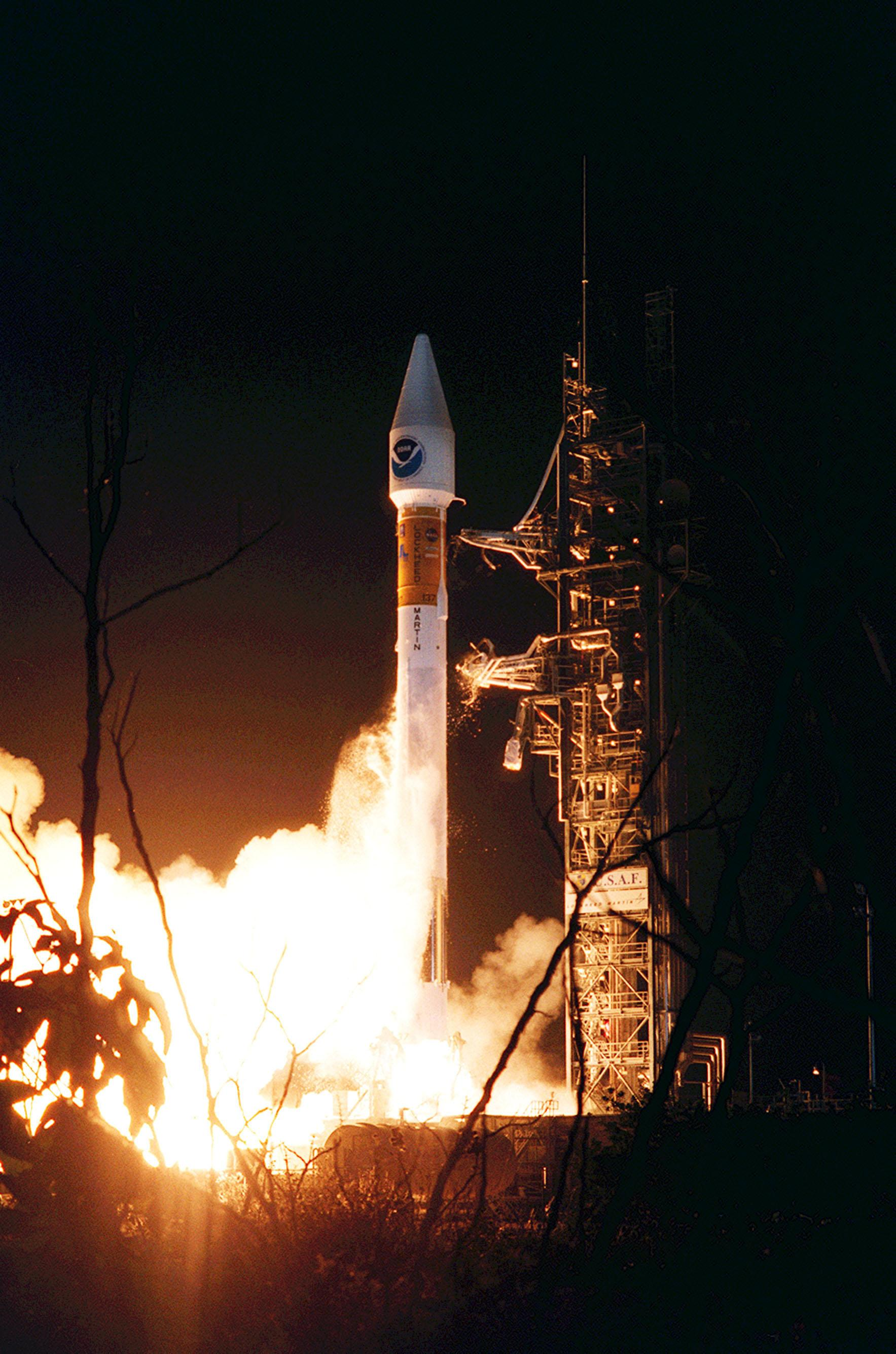
Launch of GOES-11

GOES-L was launched aboard an International Launch Services Atlas IIA rocket, flying from Space Launch Complex 36A at the Cape Canaveral Air Force Station. The launch occurred at 07:07 UTC on 3 May. The launch was originally scheduled for 15 March 1999, however it was delayed to allow the Eutelsat W3 satellite to be launched first. Following this, it was rescheduled for 15 May. On 30 April, the Centaur upper stage of a Titan IV(401)B failed during the launch of USA-143. Since a version of the Centaur was also used on the Atlas II, the launch of GOES-L was delayed a week to ensure that the same problem would not affect its launch. Less than five days after the Titan failure, a Delta III failed to launch Orion 3. The failure occurred during the second stage restart, and as the Delta III and Atlas II both used RL10 engines on their second stages, this resulted in a further delay.

When the Centaur was cleared for flight in August 1999, GOES-L was rescheduled to launch in November. This then slipped to December in order to allow a UFO to launch ahead of it, before slipping again when a DSCS launch was added to the manifest. In January 2000, a launch date of 3 May was announced. In late April a range conflict with Space Shuttle Discovery on mission STS-96 threatened to delay the launch, however the Shuttle was damaged by hail, necessitating a rollback to the Vehicle Assembly Building, so a delay to GOES-L was not necessary. The launch on 3 May occurred successfully, forty minutes into the launch window. At launch, the satellite had a mass of 2,217 kilograms (4,888 lb), and an expected operational lifespan of five years, although it carried fuel for longer. It was built by Space Systems/Loral, based on the LS-1300 satellite bus, and was the fourth of five GOES-I series satellites to be launched.

== Operations ==
Following launch, GOES-11 was positioned in geostationary orbit at a longitude of 104° West for testing and on-orbit storage. In 2006, it was moved to 135° West to replace the GOES-10 satellite, which was about to run out of fuel. By the time it entered service, it had already been in orbit for a year past the end of its design life. Its late entry into service was partly because GOES-10 exceeded its design life by over six years, and partly because GOES-12 was brought into service ahead of GOES-11 in order to allow use of a new instrument that it carried.

On December 6, 2011, GOES-11 provided its final image and was replaced by GOES-15. On December 15, 2011, the booster was fired to move the satellite 185 miles (298 km) above its previous orbit, and it was officially decommissioned on December 16, 2011.

== See also ==
- 2000 in spaceflight
- List of GOES satellites
