= GOES 7 =

NOAA weather satellite

GOES-7
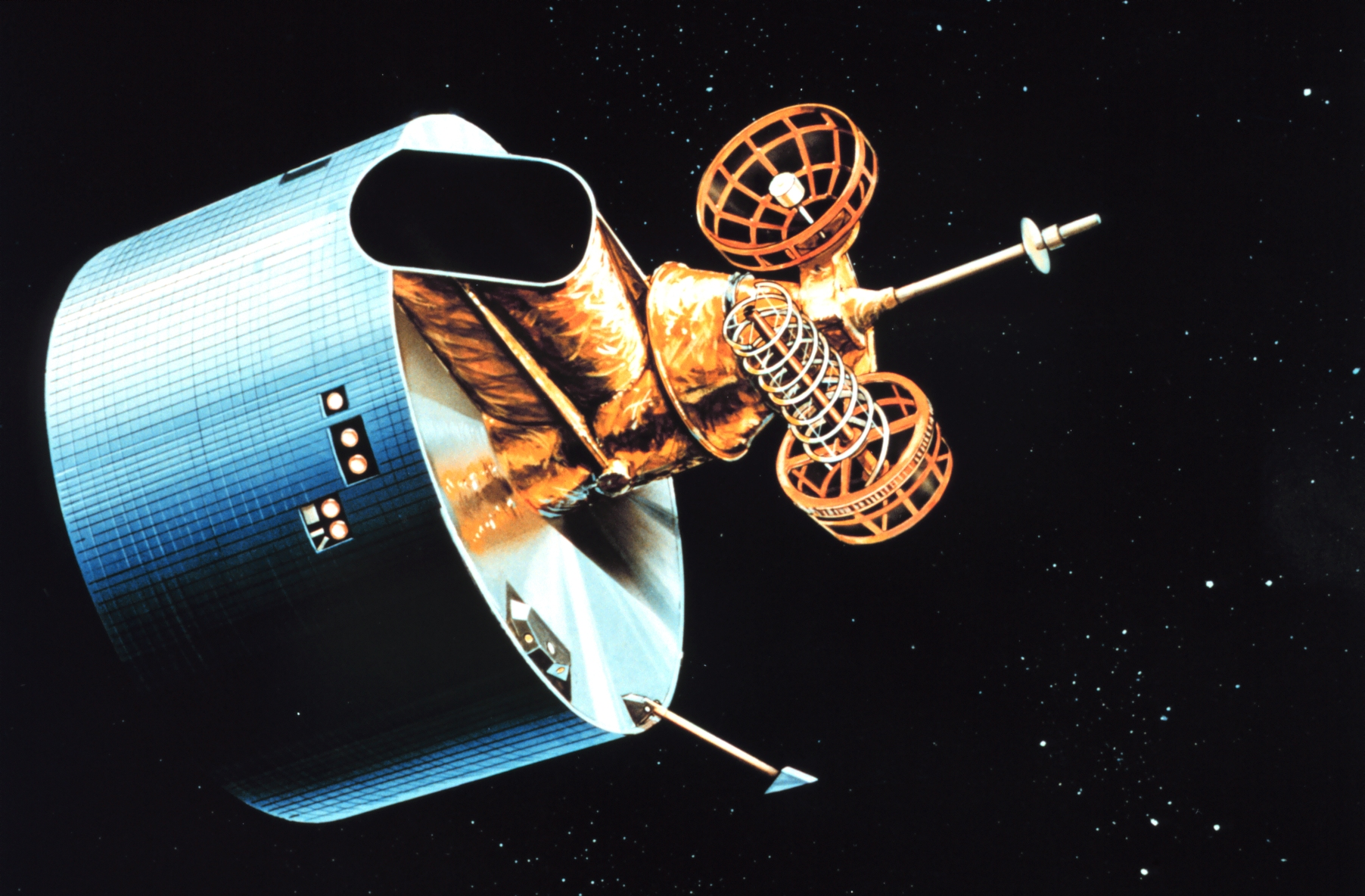
- Artist's impression of a GOES-D series satellite
- Mission type: Weather satellite
- Operator: NOAA / NASA (1987-1999); Peacesat (1999-2012)
- COSPAR ID: 1987-022A
- SATCAT no.: 17561
- Mission duration: 3-7 years (planned); 25 years (achieved)

Spacecraft properties
- Bus: HS-371
- Manufacturer: Hughes

Start of mission
- Launch date: 26 February 1987, 23:05 UTC
- Rocket: Delta 3914
- Launch site: Cape Canaveral LC-17A
- Contractor: McDonnell Douglas

End of mission
- Disposal: Decommissioned
- Deactivated: 12 April 2012

Orbital parameters
- Reference system: Geocentric
- Regime: Geostationary
- Longitude: 75° West (1987-1989); 98° West (1989-1992); 112° West (1992-1995); 135° West (1995-1999); 95° West (1999); 175° West (1999-2012)
- Slot: GOES-EAST (1987-1989); GOES-WEST (1995-1999)
- Eccentricity: 0.0002306
- Perigee altitude: 35,879 kilometres (22,294 mi)
- Apogee altitude: 35,898 kilometres (22,306 mi)
- Inclination: 15.09°
- Period: 24 hours
- Geostationary Operational Environmental Satellite (First Generation) Geostationary Operational Environmental Satellite (Second Generation)

GOES-7, known as GOES-H before becoming operational, was an American satellite. It was originally built as a weather satellite, and formed part of the US National Oceanic and Atmospheric Administration's Geostationary Operational Environmental Satellite system. Originally built as a ground spare, GOES-H was launched in 1987 due to delays with the next series of satellites. It was operated by NOAA until 1999, before being leased to Peacesat, who use it as a communications satellite. As of 2009, it was operational over the Pacific Ocean, providing communications for the Pacific Islands. On April 12, 2012, the spacecraft was finally decommissioned and moved to a graveyard orbit.

== Launch ==
GOES-H was launched aboard a McDonnell Douglas Delta 3914 rocket, flying from Launch Complex 17A at the Cape Canaveral Air Force Station. The launch occurred at 23:05 GMT on 26 February 1987. The launch had originally been scheduled for late 1986, but was delayed after GOES-G failed to achieve orbit. It was built by Hughes Space and Communications, based on the HS-371 satellite bus, and was the last of five GOES-D series satellites to be launched.

== Operations ==
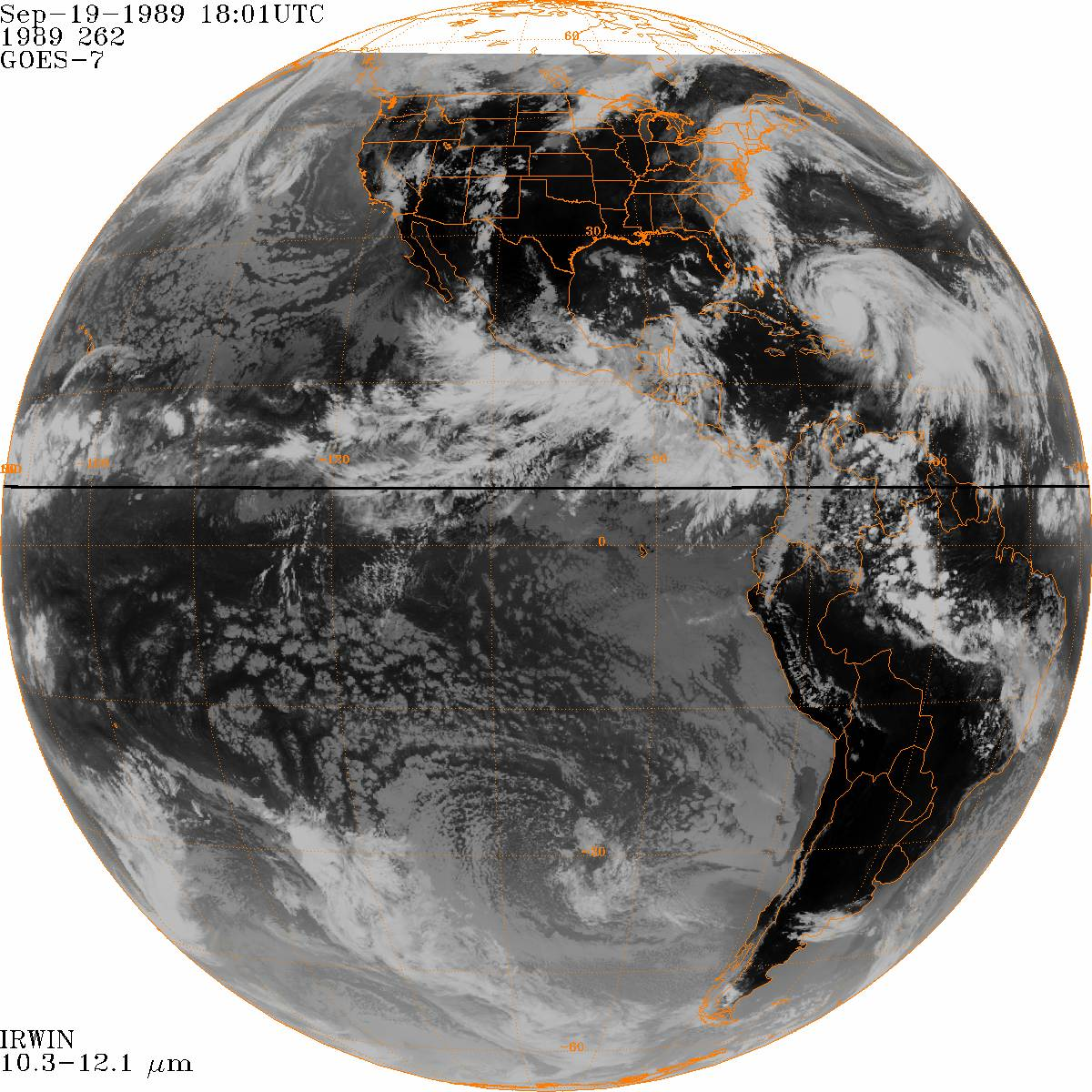
GOES-7 image; Hurricane Hugo can be seen in the Atlantic on the top right

Following launch, GOES-7 was positioned in geostationary orbit at a longitude of 75° West, where it underwent on-orbit testing before being activated in the GOES-EAST slot of the constellation.

Due to the loss of GOES-G, and delays in the development of the GOES-I series spacecraft, no reserve satellites were available in the late 1980s and early 1990s. After the imager on the GOES-6 satellite failed in 1989, GOES-7 was left as the only operational GOES satellite. It was moved to 98° West to cover the whole of the contiguous United States. In 1992, Meteosat 3 was leased from Eumetsat to take over GOES-EAST operations, allowing GOES-8 to be moved 112° West. When GOES-8 entered service in 1995, it replaced Meteosat 3, and GOES-7 was moved to the GOES-WEST position at 135° West. It remained in service until its retirement from service in 1996, at which time it was moved to 95° West. It was then transferred to Peacesat, and positioned at 175° West until its final retirement and disposal in 2012.

It is the only satellite to have been operated as both GOES-EAST and GOES-WEST in the course of normal operations. GOES-10 has been used as both GOES-EAST and GOES-WEST, however its operations as GOES-EAST were as a backup during an outage of GOES-12, and the satellite was not moved to the GOES-EAST orbital position.

== See also ==
- 1987 in spaceflight
- List of GOES satellites
