= GOES 8 =

NOAA weather satellite

GOES-8
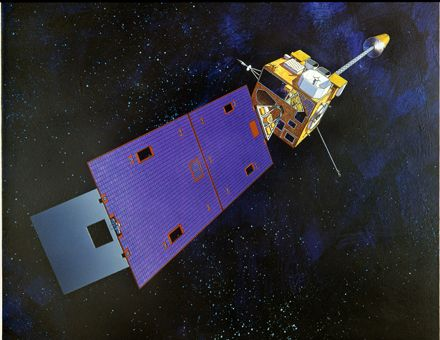
- Artist's impression of a GOES-I series satellite in orbit
- Mission type: Weather satellite
- Operator: NOAA / NASA
- COSPAR ID: 1994-022A
- SATCAT no.: 23051
- Mission duration: 3-5 years (planned); 10 years (achieved)

Spacecraft properties
- Bus: LS-1300
- Manufacturer: Space Systems/Loral
- Launch mass: 2,105 kilograms (4,641 lb)
- Power: 1057 watts

Start of mission
- Launch date: 13 April 1994, 06:04 UTC
- Rocket: Atlas I
- Launch site: Cape Canaveral LC-36B
- Contractor: Martin Marietta

End of mission
- Disposal: Decommissioned
- Deactivated: 5 May 2004

Orbital parameters
- Reference system: Geocentric
- Regime: Geostationary
- Longitude: 75° West
- Slot: GOES-EAST (1995-2003)
- Eccentricity: 0.0005384
- Perigee altitude: 36,151 kilometres (22,463 mi)
- Apogee altitude: 36,197 kilometres (22,492 mi)
- Inclination: 10.89°
- Period: 1,456.0 minutes
- Geostationary Operational Environmental Satellite (Second Generation) Geostationary Operational Environmental Satellite (First Generation)

GOES-8, known as GOES-I before becoming operational, was an American weather satellite, which formed part of the US National Oceanic and Atmospheric Administration's Geostationary Operational Environmental Satellite system. It was launched in 1994, and operated until 2004 when it was retired and boosted to a graveyard orbit. At launch, the satellite had a mass of 2,105 kilograms (4,641 lb), and an expected operational lifespan of three or five years. It was built by Space Systems/Loral, based on the LS-1300 satellite bus, and was the first of five GOES-I series satellites to be launched.

== Launch ==
GOES-I was launched aboard a Martin Marietta Atlas I rocket, flying from Launch Complex 36B at the Cape Canaveral Air Force Station. The launch occurred at 06:04 GMT on 13 April 1994, and placed the satellite into a geosynchronous transfer orbit. It was then raised into geostationary orbit by means of an R-4D-11 apogee motor. During the first burn of the apogee motor, an unusually high temperature was detected in one of the flanges upon which a thruster was mounted, however later analysis, based on satellites using similar thruster systems, demonstrated that it was still acceptable. During the third burn, a malfunction of the computer controlling the attitude control system caused several manoeuvring thrusters to fire. This resulted in the burn being aborted.

GOES-8 was eventually raised to the correct orbit, and positioned at a longitude of 75° West. Following on-orbit testing, it was activated as the GOES-EAST satellite, allowing GOES-7, which had previously been covering both positions, to assume GOES-WEST operations.

== Operations ==
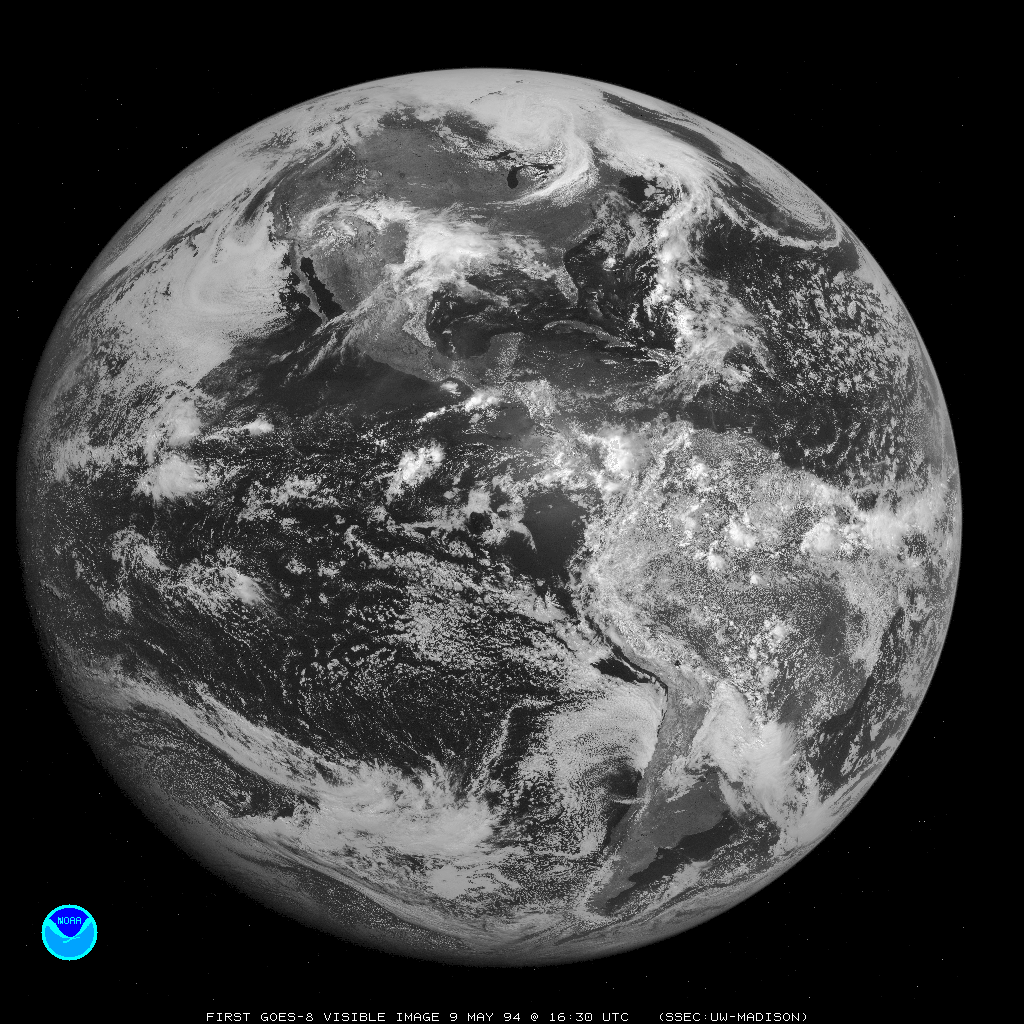
The first image returned by GOES-8

GOES-8 suffered from a design fault with the motor windings in its imager and sounder, with one of two sets failing within a few years of it becoming operational. If the other set had failed, it would have made the system inoperable. This fault also occurred on the GOES-9 satellite, which was launched in 1995. It was corrected before GOES-10 was launched. In 1997, one of its momentum wheels failed, however unlike with GOES-9, the other wheel was not affected, and the satellite was able to continue operations. GOES-8 was also featured in the 1996 film Twister.

GOES-8 was retired from GOES-EAST operations in 2003, when it was replaced by GOES-12. Following this it remained in storage for a year as a backup, before being boosted to a graveyard orbit between 4 and 5 May 2004.

== See also ==
- 1994 in spaceflight
- List of GOES satellites
