= List of GOES satellites =

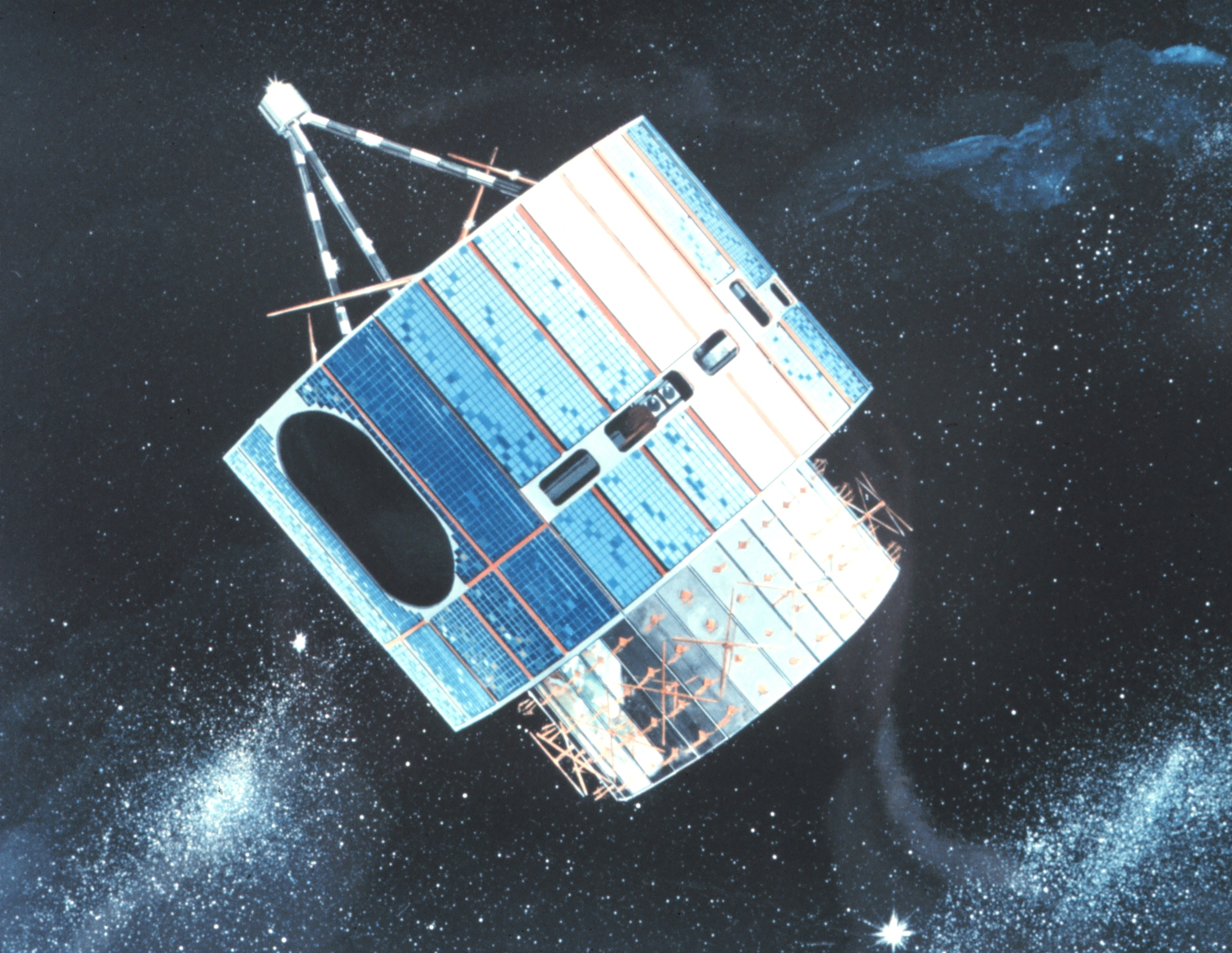
SMS-derived GOES satellite

This is a list of Geostationary Operational Environmental Satellites. GOES spacecraft are operated by the United States National Oceanic and Atmospheric Administration, with NASA responsible for research and development, and later procurement of spacecraft.

== Imagery ==
Comparison of imagery

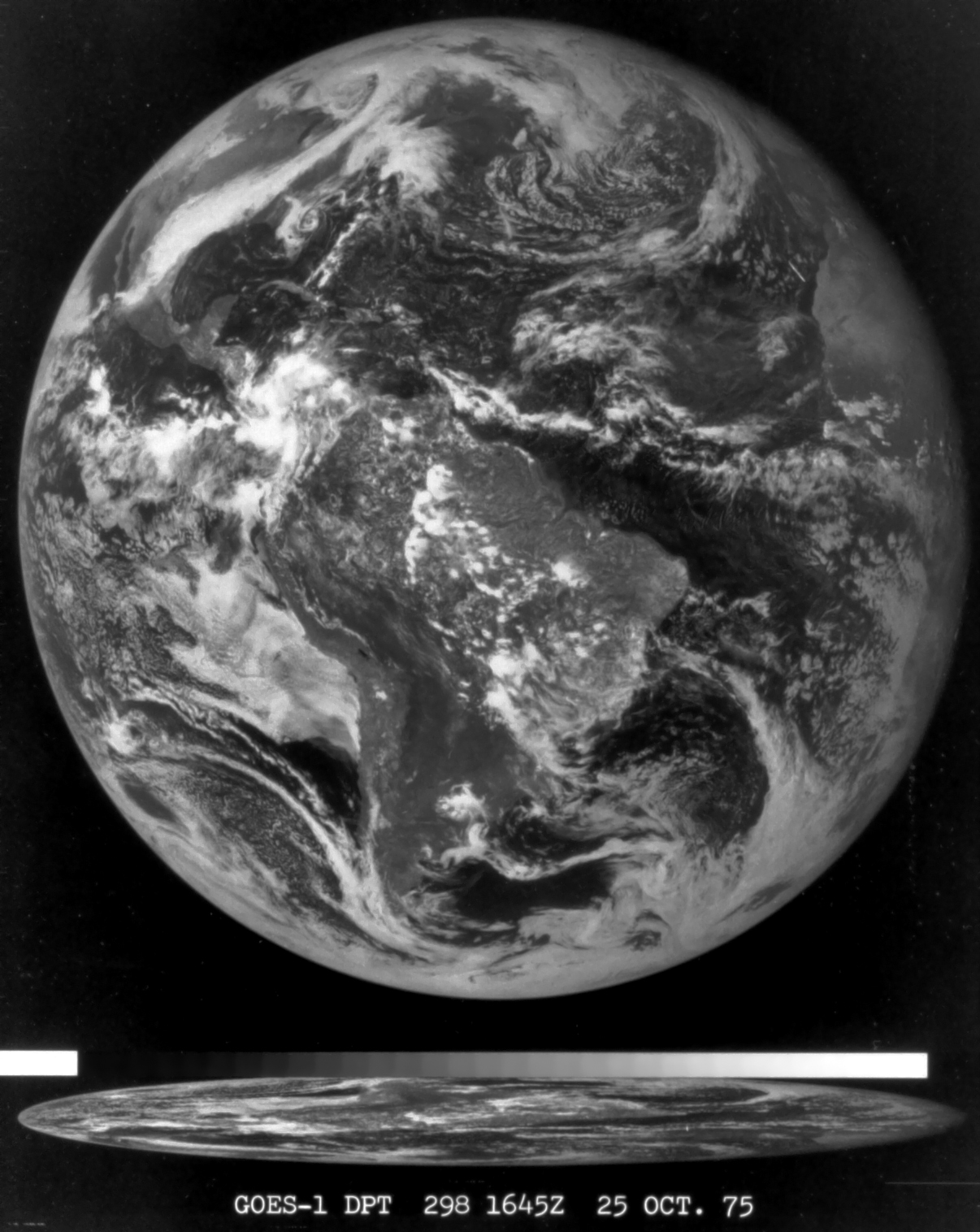
SMS-derived (GOES-1)

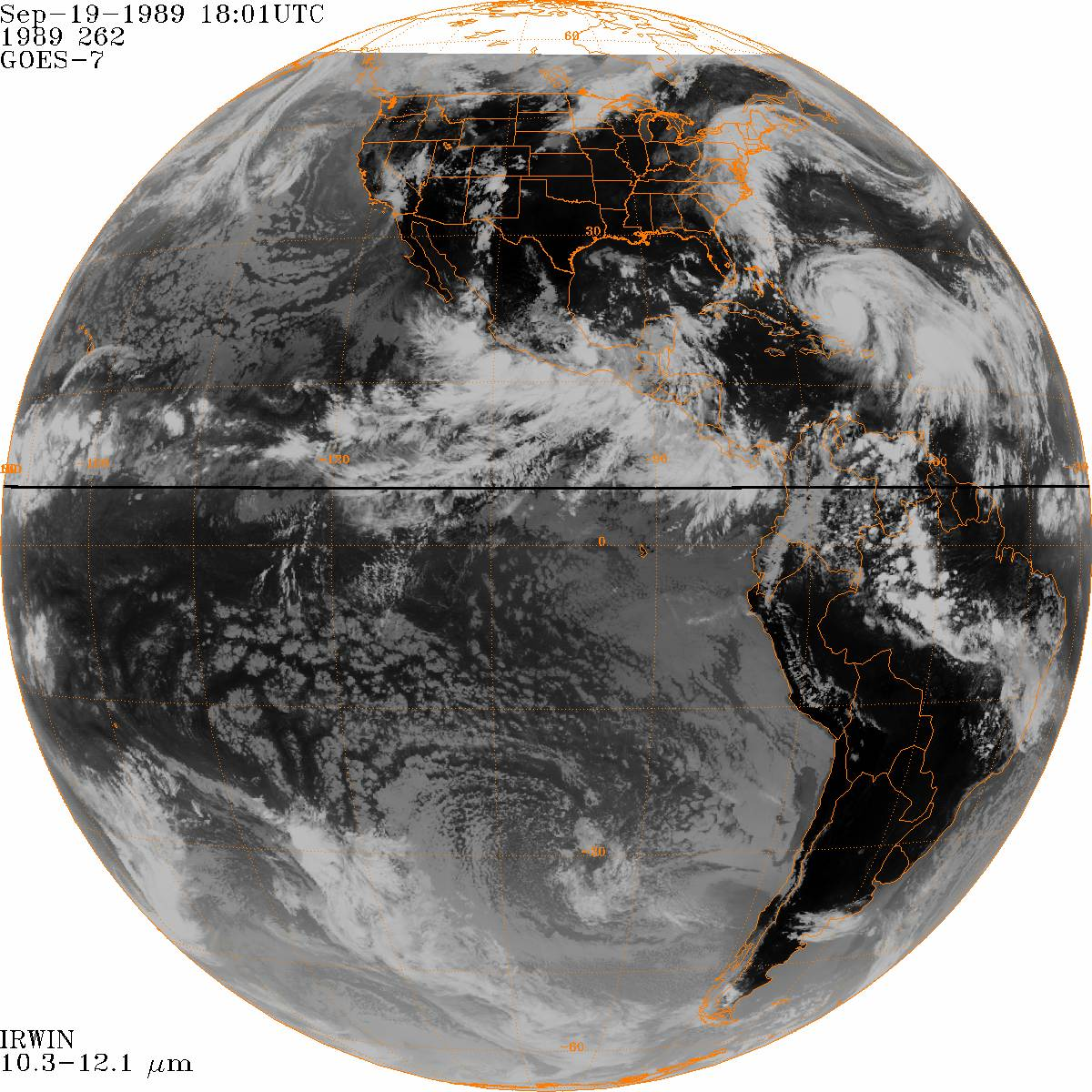
First-generation (GOES-7)

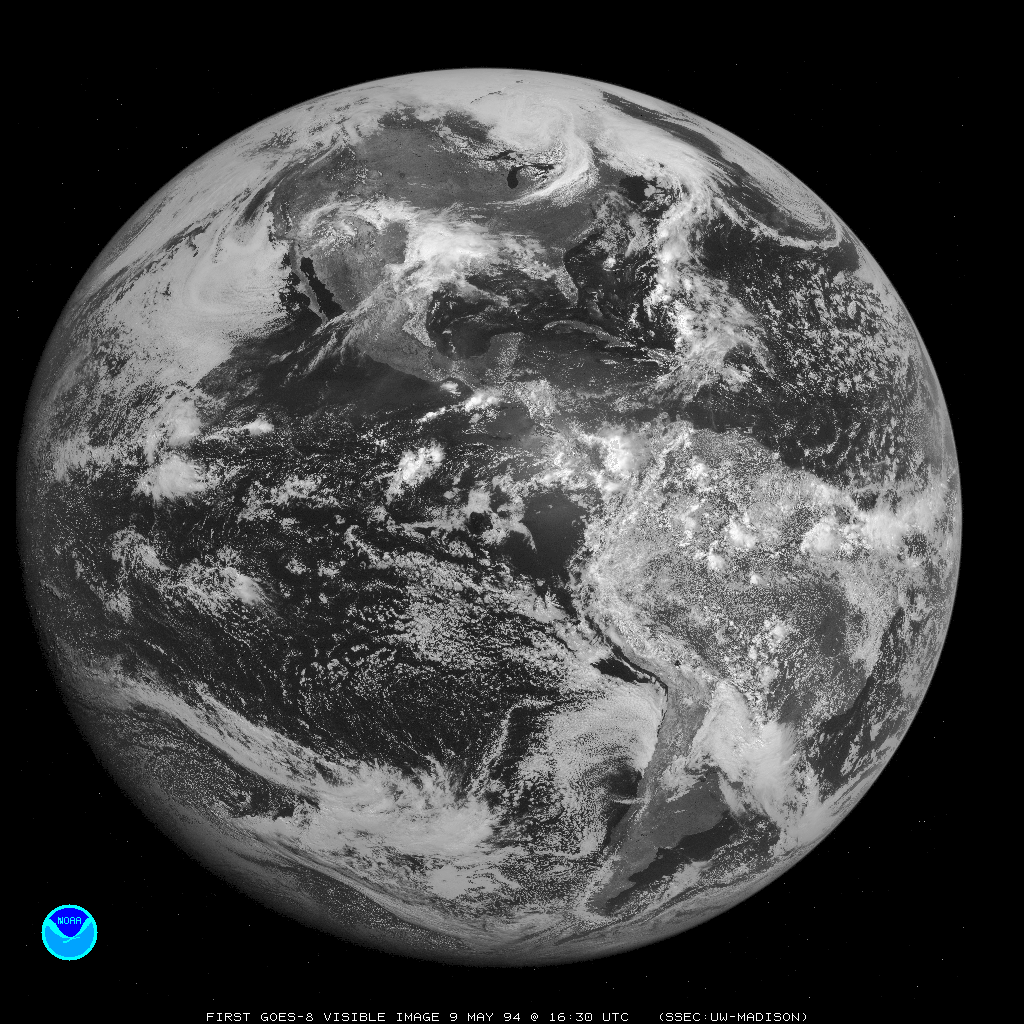
Second-generation (GOES-8)

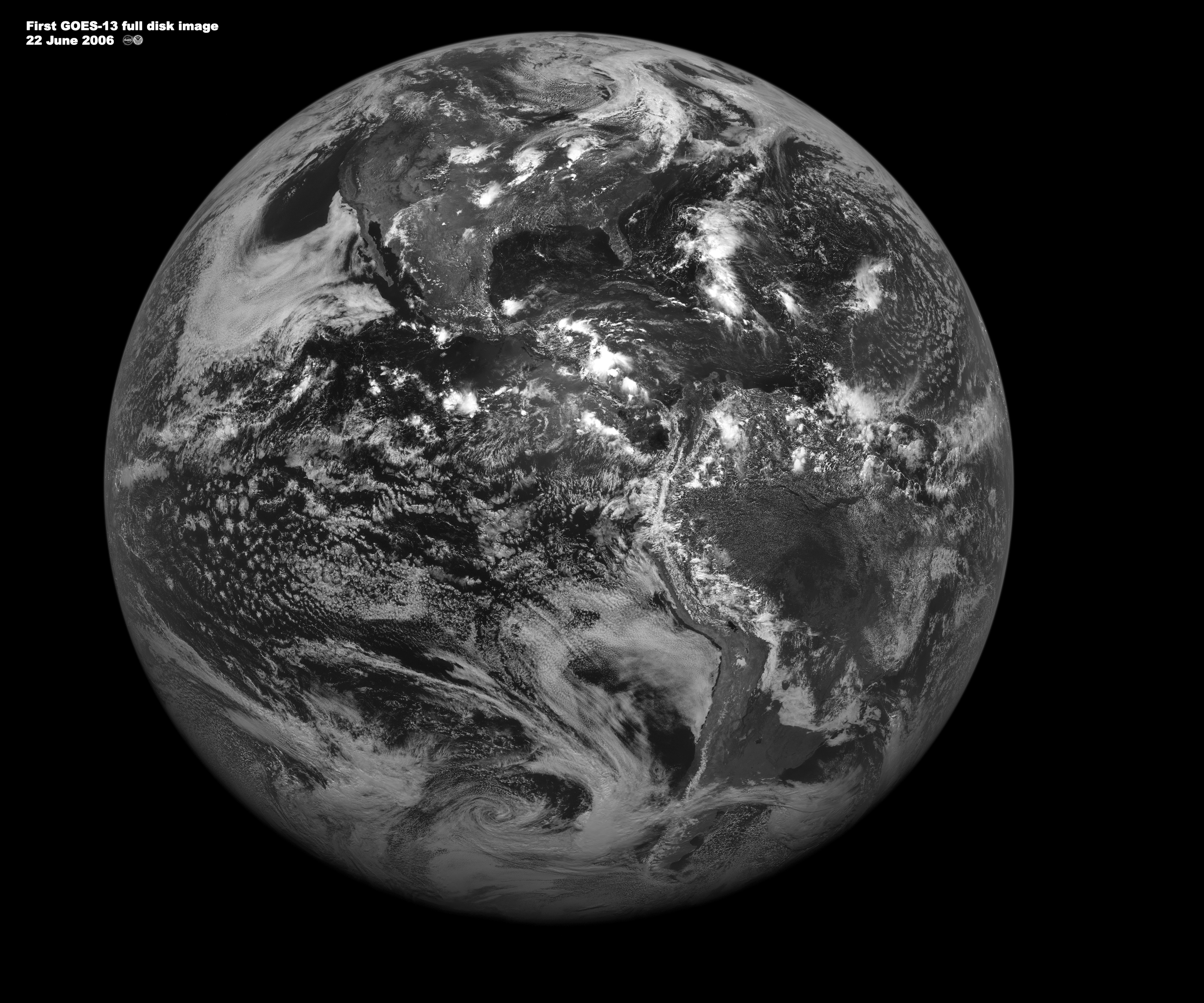
Third-generation (GOES-13)

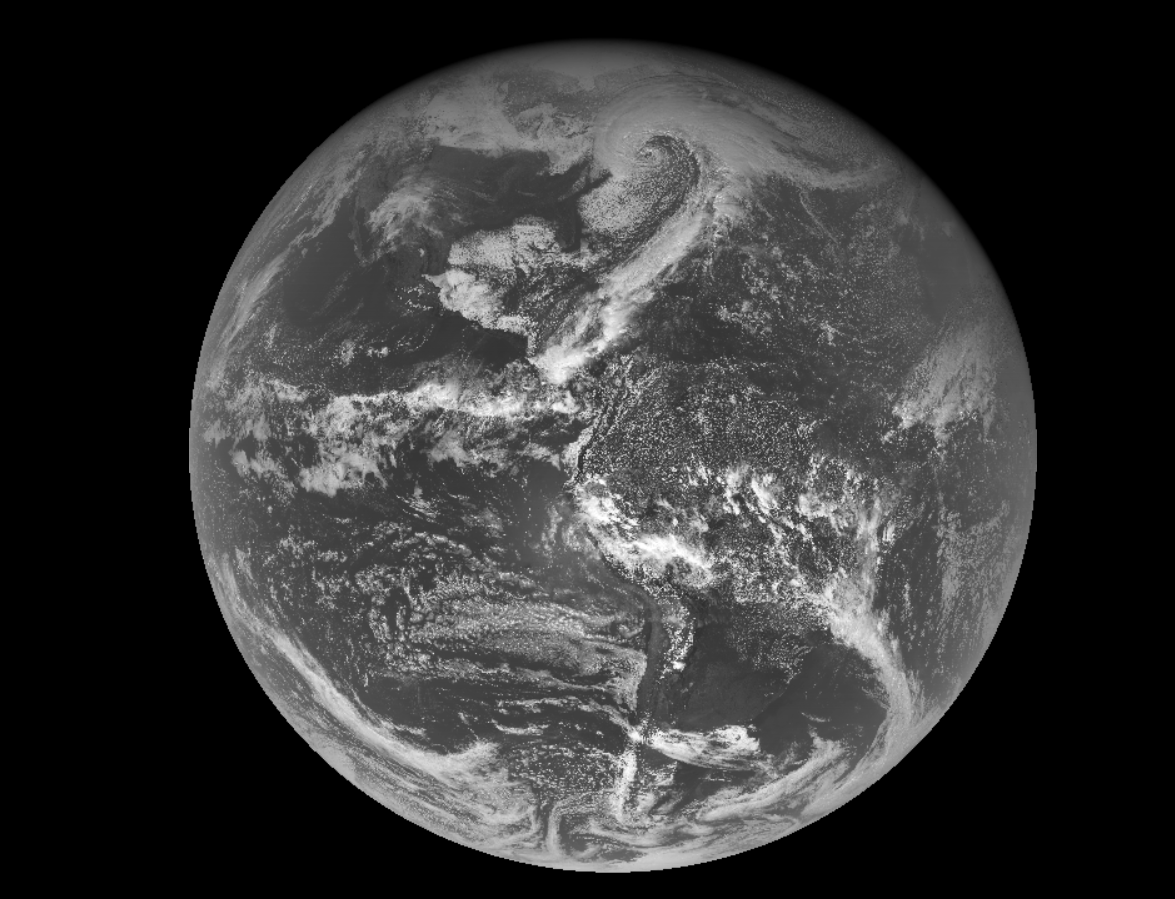
Fourth-generation (GOES-16)

Fourth-generation (GOES-18)

== Satellites ==
Designation		Launch Date/Time (UTC)	Rocket	Launch Site	Longitude	First Image	Status	Retirement	Remarks
Launch	Operational	Launch Date/Time (UTC)	Rocket	Launch Site	Longitude	First Image	Status	Retirement	Remarks
=== SMS-derived satellites === Manufactured by Ford Aerospace
GOES-A	GOES-1	16 October 1975, 22:40	Delta 2914	CCAFS LC-17A		25 October 1975	Retired	7 March 1985	
GOES-B	GOES-2	15 June 1977, 10:51	Delta 2914	CCAFS LC-17B	60° W		Retired	1993	Reactivated as comsat in 1995, finally deactivated in May 2001
GOES-C	GOES-3	16 June 1978, 10:49	Delta 2914	CCAFS LC-17B			Retired	1993	Reactivated as comsat in 1995, decommissioned 29 June 2016
=== First generation === Built on a Hughes Space and Communications HS-371 spacecraft bus
GOES-D	GOES-4	9 September 1980, 22:57	Delta 3914	CCAFS LC-17A	135° W		Retired	22 November 1988	
GOES-E	GOES-5	22 May 1981, 22:29	Delta 3914	CCAFS LC-17A	75° W		Retired	18 July 1990	
GOES-F	GOES-6	28 April 1983, 22:26	Delta 3914	CCAFS LC-17A	136° W		Retired	21 January 1989	
GOES-G	N/A	3 May 1986, 22:18	Delta 3914	CCAFS LC-17A	135° W (planned)	N/A	Failed	+71 seconds	Launch failure
GOES-H	GOES-7	26 February 1987, 23:05	Delta 3914	CCAFS LC-17A	75° W, 98° W, 112° W, 135° W, 95° W, 175° W		Retired	January 1996	Reactivated as comsat for Peacesat from 1999 to 2012, moved to graveyard orbit 12 April 2012.
=== Second generation === Built on a Space Systems/Loral LS-1300 spacecraft bus
GOES-I	GOES-8	13 April 1994, 06:04	Atlas I	CCAFS LC-36B	75° W	9 May 1994	Retired	4 May 2004	In graveyard orbit
GOES-J	GOES-9	23 May 1995, 05:52	Atlas I	CCAFS LC-36B	135° W, 155° E	19 June 1995	Retired	14 June 2007	In graveyard orbit
GOES-K	GOES-10	25 April 1997, 05:49	Atlas I	CCAFS LC-36B	135° W, 65° W	13 May 1997	Retired	1 December 2009	In graveyard orbit
GOES-L	GOES-11	3 May 2000, 07:07	Atlas IIA	CCAFS SLC-36A	135° W	17 May 2000	Retired	16 December 2011	Retired, Drifting west
GOES-M	GOES-12	23 July 2001, 07:23	Atlas IIA	CCAFS SLC-36A	60° W	17 August 2001	Retired	16 August 2013	Operated at GOES-South covering South America, and retained as spare, following replacement at GOES-East by GOES-13. Now in a graveyard orbit.
=== Third generation === Built on a Boeing BSS-601 spacecraft bus
GOES-N	GOES-13	24 May 2006, 22:11	Delta IV-M+(4,2)	CCAFS SLC-37B	75° W, 61.5° E	22 June 2006	Inactive		Replaced by GOES-16 at GOES-East on 18 December 2017. Operational again as EWS-G1 since 8 September 2020.
GOES-O	GOES-14	27 June 2009, 22:51	Delta IV-M+(4,2)	CCAFS SLC-37B	105° W	27 July 2009	Standby		On-orbit spare, was used to cover GOES-East imagery and moved into position following GOES-13 malfunction in 2012, also activated to cover GOES-13 outage in mid-2013
GOES-P	GOES-15	4 March 2010, 23:57	Delta IV-M+(4,2)	CCAFS SLC-37B	61.7° E (Formerly 89.5° W, 135° W)	7 April 2010	Transferred		Transferred to United States Space Force for coverage over Indian Ocean as EWS-G2.
GOES-Q	NA	N/A					Not built	N/A	Planned but not contracted
=== Fourth generation (GOES-R Series) === Built on a Lockheed Martin A2100 spacecraft bus
GOES-R	GOES-16	19 November 2016, 23:42	Atlas V 541	CCAFS SLC-41	105° W (Formerly 75.2° W)	15 January 2017	Standby		Former GOES-East, replaced by GOES-19 on 7 April 2025
GOES-S	GOES-17	1 March 2018	Atlas V 541	CCAFS SLC-41	89.5° W (Formerly 104.7° W, 137.2° W)	13 November 2018	Standby		Former GOES-West, replaced by GOES-18 on 4 January 2023
GOES-T	GOES-18	1 March 2022 21:38	Atlas V 541	CCSFS SLC-41	137.2° W		Active		GOES-West
GOES-U	GOES-19	25 June 2024	Falcon Heavy	KSC LC-39A	75.2°W	7 April 2025	Active		GOES-East
