= GOES 9 =

NOAA weather satellite

GOES-9
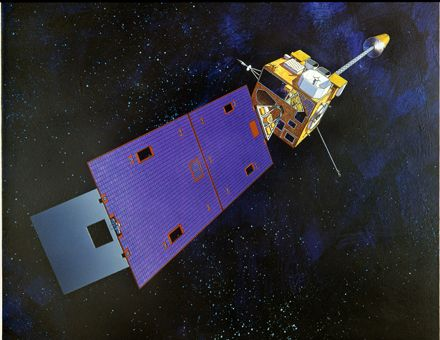
- Artist's impression of a GOES-I series satellite in orbit
- Mission type: Weather satellite
- Operator: NOAA / NASA
- COSPAR ID: 1995-025A
- SATCAT no.: 23581
- Mission duration: 3 years (planned); 12 years (achieved)

Spacecraft properties
- Bus: LS-1300
- Manufacturer: Space Systems/Loral
- Launch mass: 2,105 kilograms (4,641 lb)
- Power: 973.0 watts

Start of mission
- Launch date: 23 May 1995, 05:52:02 UTC
- Rocket: Atlas I
- Launch site: Cape Canaveral LC-36B
- Contractor: ILS

End of mission
- Disposal: Decommissioned
- Deactivated: 14 June 2007

Orbital parameters
- Reference system: Geocentric
- Regime: Geostationary
- Longitude: 90° West (1995); 135° West (1996-1998); 155° East (2003-2005)
- Slot: GOES-WEST (1996-1998)
- Perigee altitude: 36,170 kilometers (22,470 mi)
- Apogee altitude: 36,238 kilometers (22,517 mi)
- Inclination: 8.7858°
- Period: 24 hours
- Geostationary Operational Environmental Satellite (Second Generation)

GOES-9, known as GOES-J before becoming operational, was an American weather satellite, which formed part of the U.S. National Oceanic and Atmospheric Administration's Geostationary Operational Environmental Satellite system. It was launched in 1995, and operated until 2007 when it was retired and boosted to a graveyard orbit. At launch, the satellite had a mass of 2,105 kilograms (4,641 lb), and an expected operational lifespan of three years. It was built by Space Systems/Loral, based on the LS-1300 satellite bus, and was the second of five GOES-I series satellites to be launched.

== Launch ==
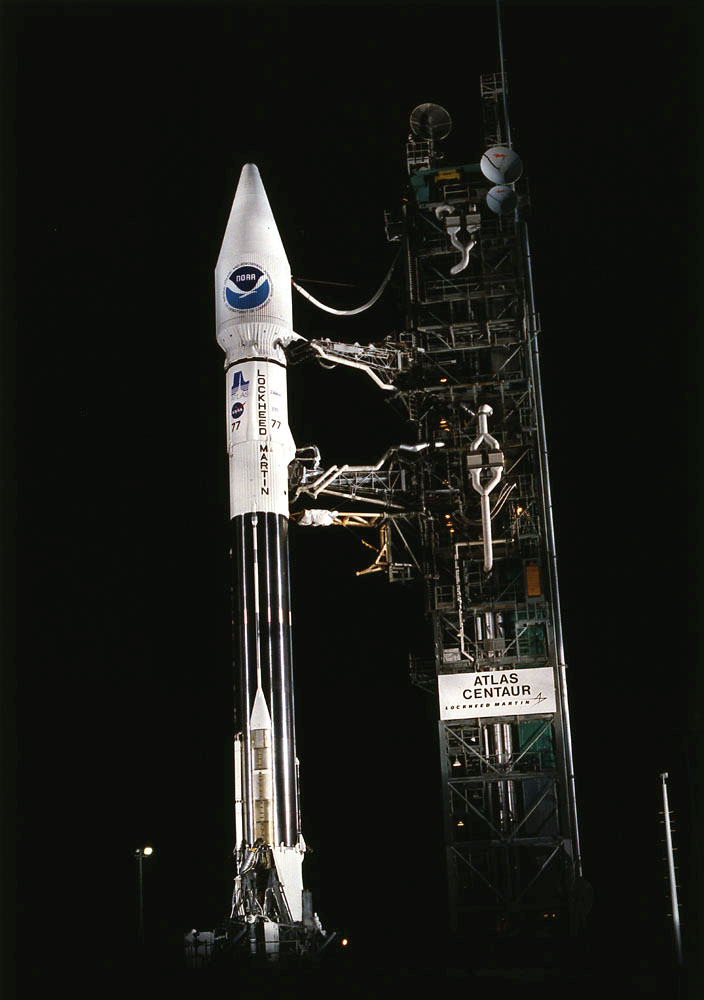
GOES-J atop an Atlas I before launch

GOES-J was launched aboard an International Launch Services Atlas I rocket, flying from Launch Complex 36B at the Cape Canaveral Air Force Station. The launch occurred at 05:52:02 GMT on 23 May 1995. Following launch, it was positioned in geostationary orbit at a longitude of 90° West for on-orbit testing. Once this was complete, it was moved to 135° West, where it assumed GOES-WEST operations.

== Operations ==
GOES-9 suffered from a design fault with the motor windings in its imager and sounder, with one of two sets failing in 1997. If the other set had failed, it would have made the system inoperable. This fault also occurred on the GOES-8 satellite, however it was corrected before GOES-10 was launched.

In June 1998 GOES-9 developed a problem with one of its two reaction wheels, which were used to control its orientation. It was drawing more power than expected, and generating noise, visible in some of the images it returned. After the other wheel started developing the same problem in July, a decision was made to replace GOES-9 with the backup satellite, GOES-10. GOES-10 took over imagery at the end of July, and reached 135° West in August. Following replacement, GOES-9 was moved back to 105° West, and placed into storage as a backup. It was reactivated in December 2001 for evaluation of its imager and reaction wheels, after which it was placed back into storage.

== Replacement of GMS-5 ==
In 2003, GOES-9 was reactivated again, and leased to the Japan Meteorological Agency as a replacement for the GMS-5 satellite at 155° East, because its intended replacement, MTSAT-1, had failed to reach orbit. It remained in this position until MTSAT-1R became operational in November 2005, at which time GOES-9 was again deactivated and placed into storage. It was permanently retired from service and raised to a graveyard orbit on 14 June 2007.

== See also ==
- 1995 in spaceflight
- List of GOES satellites
