= GOES 10 =

NOAA weather satellite

GOES-10
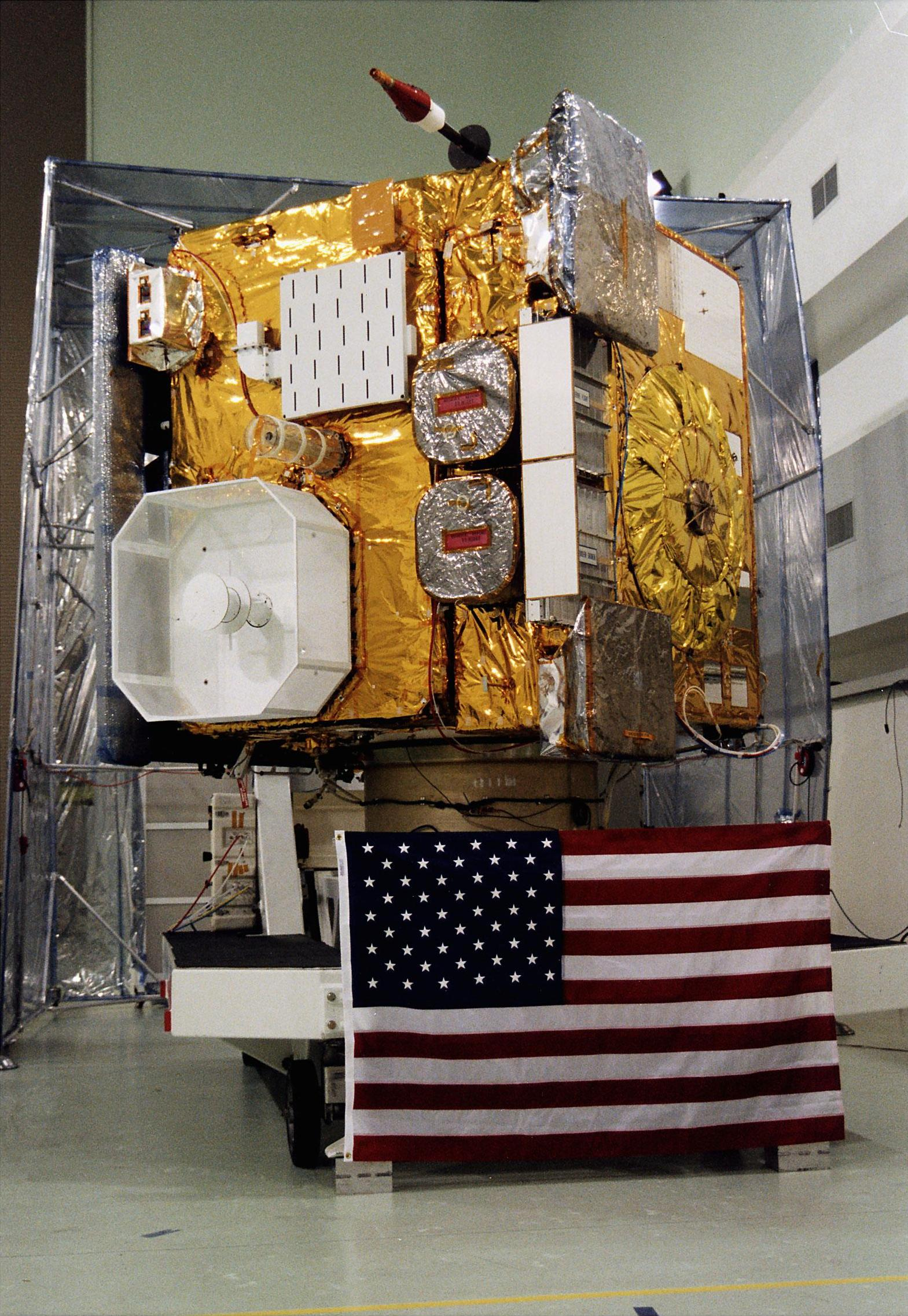
- GOES-K before launch
- Mission type: Weather satellite
- Operator: NOAA / NASA
- COSPAR ID: 1997-019A
- SATCAT no.: 24786
- Website: goes.gsfc.nasa.gov/text/goesnew.html
- Mission duration: 5 years (planned); 12 years (achieved)

Spacecraft properties
- Bus: LS-1300
- Manufacturer: Space Systems/Loral
- Launch mass: 2,105 kilograms (4,641 lb)

Start of mission
- Launch date: 25 April 1997, 05:49 UTC
- Rocket: Atlas I
- Launch site: Cape Canaveral LC-36B
- Contractor: ILS

End of mission
- Disposal: Decommissioned
- Deactivated: 1 December 2009

Orbital parameters
- Reference system: Geocentric
- Regime: Geostationary
- Longitude: 105° West (1997-1998); 135° West (1998-2006); 60° West (2006-2009)
- Slot: GOES-WEST (1998-2006); GOES-SOUTH (2006-2009)
- Eccentricity: 0.0029811
- Perigee altitude: 35,983 kilometres (22,359 mi)
- Apogee altitude: 36,237 kilometres (22,517 mi)
- Inclination: 7.0380°
- Period: 24 hours
- RAAN: 55.6258°
- Geostationary Operational Environmental Satellite (Second Generation)

GOES-10, known as GOES-K before becoming operational, was an American weather satellite, which formed part of the US National Oceanic and Atmospheric Administration's Geostationary Operational Environmental Satellite system. It was launched in 1997, and after completing operations as part of the main GOES system, it was kept online as a backup spacecraft until December 2009, providing coverage of South America as GOES-SOUTH, and being used to assist with hurricane predictions for North America. It was retired and maneuvered to a graveyard orbit on 1 December 2009.

== Launch ==
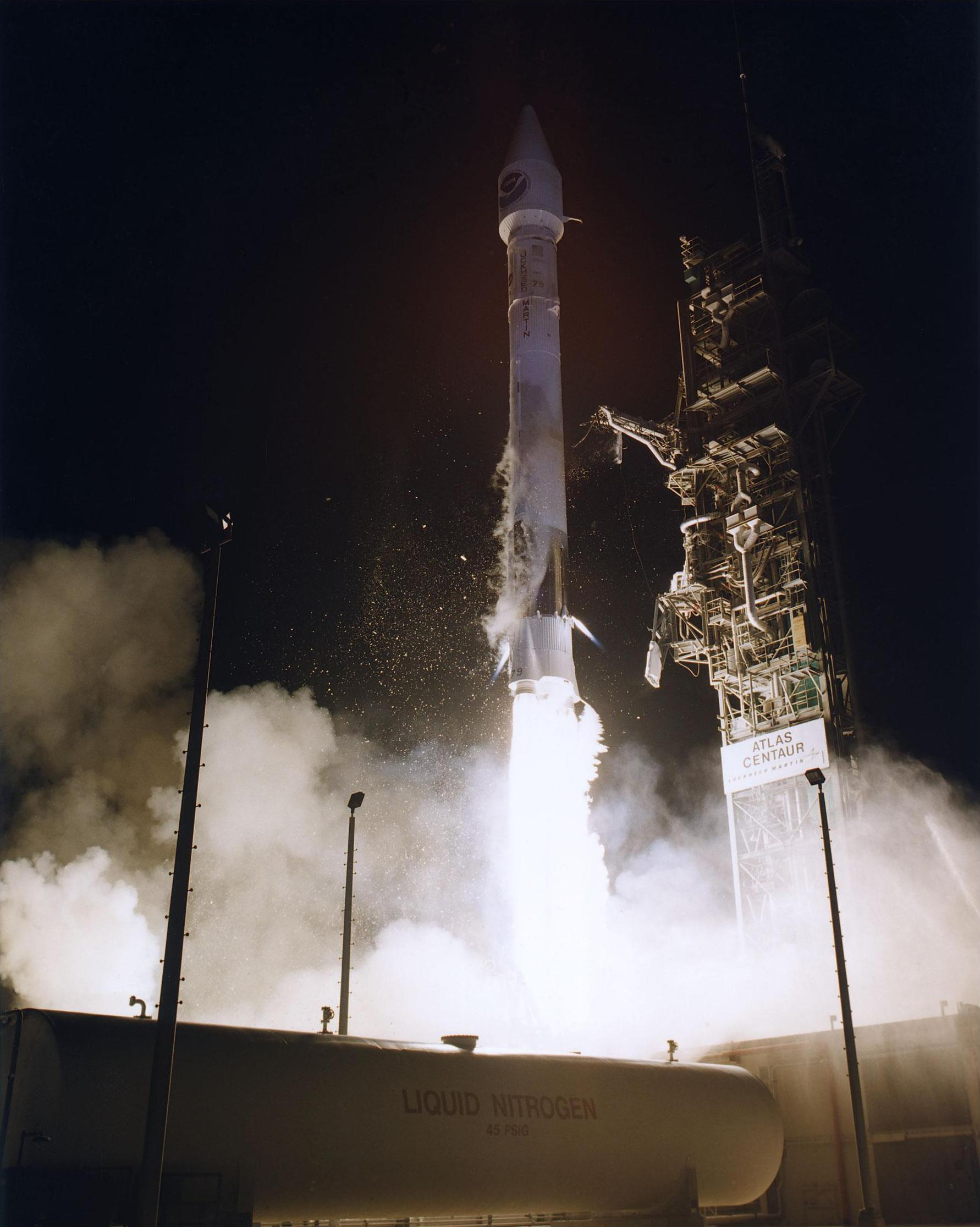
Launch of GOES-K

GOES-K was launched aboard an International Launch Services Atlas I rocket, flying from Launch Complex 36B at the Cape Canaveral Air Force Station. The launch occurred at 05:49 GMT on 25 April. Its launch was the final flight of the Atlas I rocket, which was retired in favour of the modernised Atlas II. At launch, the satellite had a mass of 2,105 kilograms (4,641 lb), and an expected operational lifespan of five years. It was built by Space Systems/Loral, based on the LS-1300 satellite bus, and was the third of five GOES-I series satellites to be launched. Following launch, it was positioned in geostationary orbit at a longitude of 105° West for on-orbit testing.

== Operations ==
During on-orbit testing, the system used to rotate the solar array in order to track the Sun started to malfunction. Early in testing it briefly stopped working twice, and then seventeen days into testing, it stopped completely. Following two months of analysis, it was determined that it had only stopped working in one direction, so the satellite was rotated 180 degrees, and the array operated in reverse. Because of this fault, testing lasted longer than originally planned, with the satellite finally being powered down for storage as a backup in June 1998, a process that was originally scheduled for August of the previous year. Less than a month later, it was reactivated after the attitude control system on the GOES-9 satellite started to fail. During July, it was prepared for operational service, before assuming GOES-WEST operations at the end of the month. In August, it was moved to a longitude of 135° West, where it relieved GOES-9. GOES-10 transmitted weather data while it was still moving, which required users to track the satellite in order to continue receiving data. This was the first time that a GOES satellite which was still operational was replaced.

GOES-10 was operated at 135° West until 27 June 2006, when it was replaced by GOES-11, as it was running low on fuel. It remained operational as a backup satellite until GOES-13 became operational, and was then moved to a new position at 60° West, from where it provided data on South America, and monitored the Main Development Region to help forecast hurricanes. In December 2007, it briefly took over GOES-EAST during an outage of GOES-12, although it remained at 60° West. This made it one of only two satellites to have been used as both GOES-EAST and GOES-WEST, the other being GOES-7. GOES-10 was retired on 1 December 2009 due to almost complete depletion of propellant. Remaining fuel was used to boost it into a graveyard orbit.

== See also ==
- 1997 in spaceflight
- List of GOES satellites
