= Atlas I =

American expendable launch system

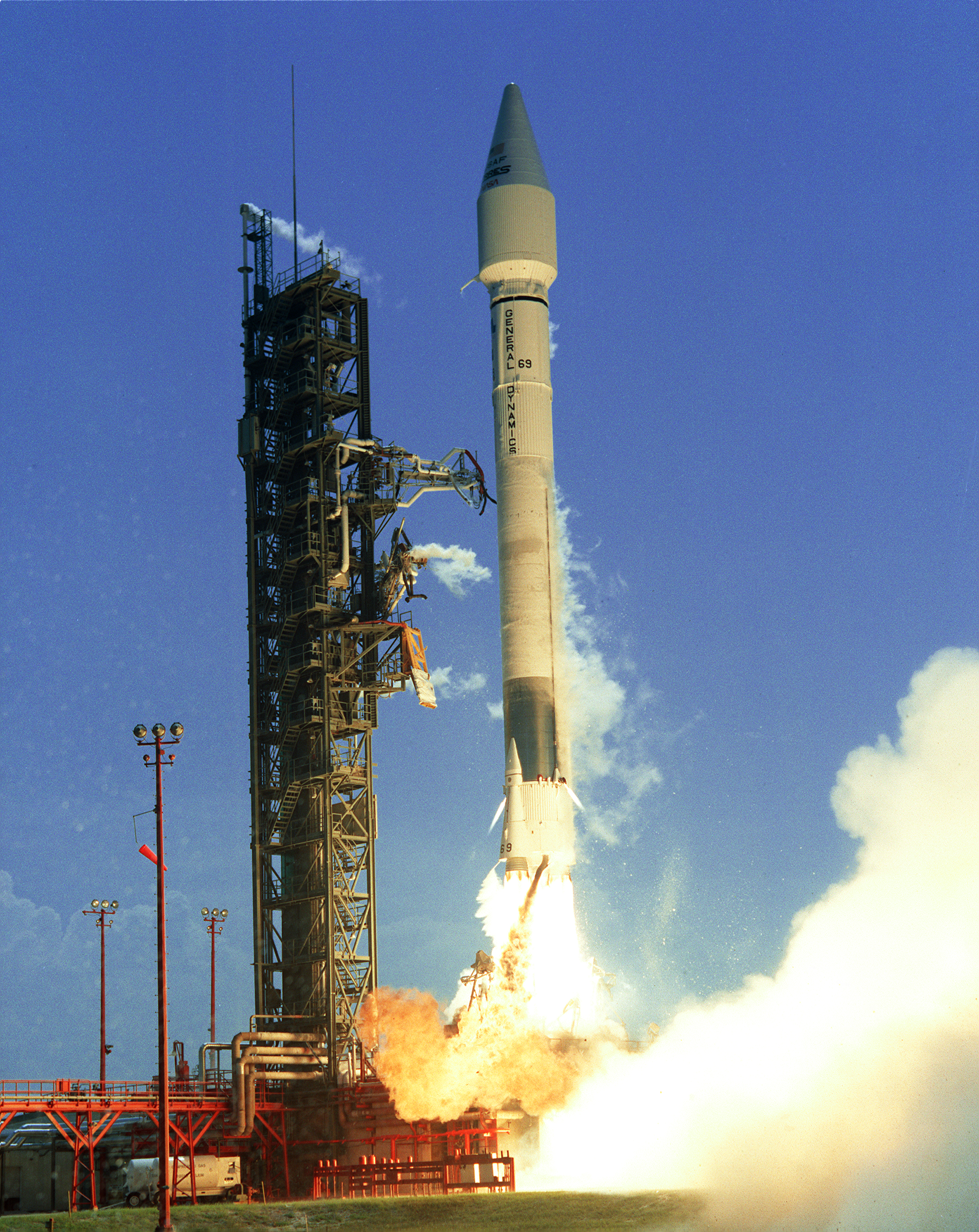
- Launch of the maiden flight of the Atlas I, with the CRRES satellite
- Function: Expendable launch system
- Manufacturer: General Dynamics
- Country of origin: United States

Size
- Height: 43.90m (144.00 ft)
- Diameter: 3.05m (10 ft)
- Mass: 164,300kg (362,200 lb)
- Stages: 2.5

Capacity

Payload to 185 km (115 mi) LEO
- Mass: 5,900 kg (13,000 lb)

Payload to GTO
- Mass: 2,375 kg (5,236 lb)

Associated rockets
- Family: Atlas

Launch history
- Status: Retired
- Launch sites: LC-36B, Cape Canaveral
- Total launches: 11
- Success(es): 8
- Failure: 3
- First flight: July 25, 1990
- Last flight: April 25, 1997

Boosters – MA-5
- No. boosters: 1
- Powered by: 2 LR-89-7
- Maximum thrust: 1,901.6 kN (427,500 lb_{f})
- Specific impulse: 293.4 s (2.877 km/s)
- Burn time: 155 seconds
- Propellant: RP-1 / LOX

First stage
- Powered by: 1 LR-105-7
- Maximum thrust: 386.4 kN (86,900 lb_{f})
- Specific impulse: 316 s (3.10 km/s)
- Burn time: 266 seconds
- Propellant: RP-1 / LOX

Second stage – Centaur
- Powered by: 2 RL10A
- Maximum thrust: 147 kN (33,000 lb_{f})
- Specific impulse: 449 s (4.40 km/s)
- Burn time: 410 seconds
- Propellant: LH_{2} / LOX

The Atlas I was a US expendable launch system manufactured by General Dynamics in the 1990s to launch a variety of satellites. It was largely a commercial rebrand of the Atlas G (although it did fly multiple government payloads), but did feature several electrical and guidance improvements. Atlas I did not feature any major payload capacity improvements over its predecessor but did offer a larger payload fairing option. Eleven launches took place, with three failures.

Atlas I would be further developed and improved upon to produce the highly successful Atlas II rocket.

== Background ==
The production line of Atlas G, the predecessor to Atlas I, was wound down and eventually mothballed in the 1980s as the Space Shuttle came online. The Shuttle's promise of a rapid launch cadence and lower launch costs resulted in dwindling demand for Atlas, and expendable rockets as a whole. However, the Space Shuttle Challenger disaster in January 1986 caused second-guessing of the Shuttle's ability, and renewed interest in uncrewed expendable launch vehicles. Atlas G production would now be restarted, under the name Atlas I, sporting guidance upgrades. In June 1987, General Dynamics committed $100M to acquire long-lead procurement items to support the build of 18 vehicles for sale commercially.

The "I" in "Atlas I" can cause confusion, as all previous Atlas rockets were designated using letters, ending with the Atlas H. However, subsequent rockets were designated using Roman numerals, starting with the Atlas II. Officially, the "I" is the Roman numeral "1".

== Design ==
Atlas I was the last use of the classic Atlas design with three engines, a jettisonable booster section, and two vernier engines. While retaining most of those features, Atlas II replaced the verniers with a hydrazine roll control system.

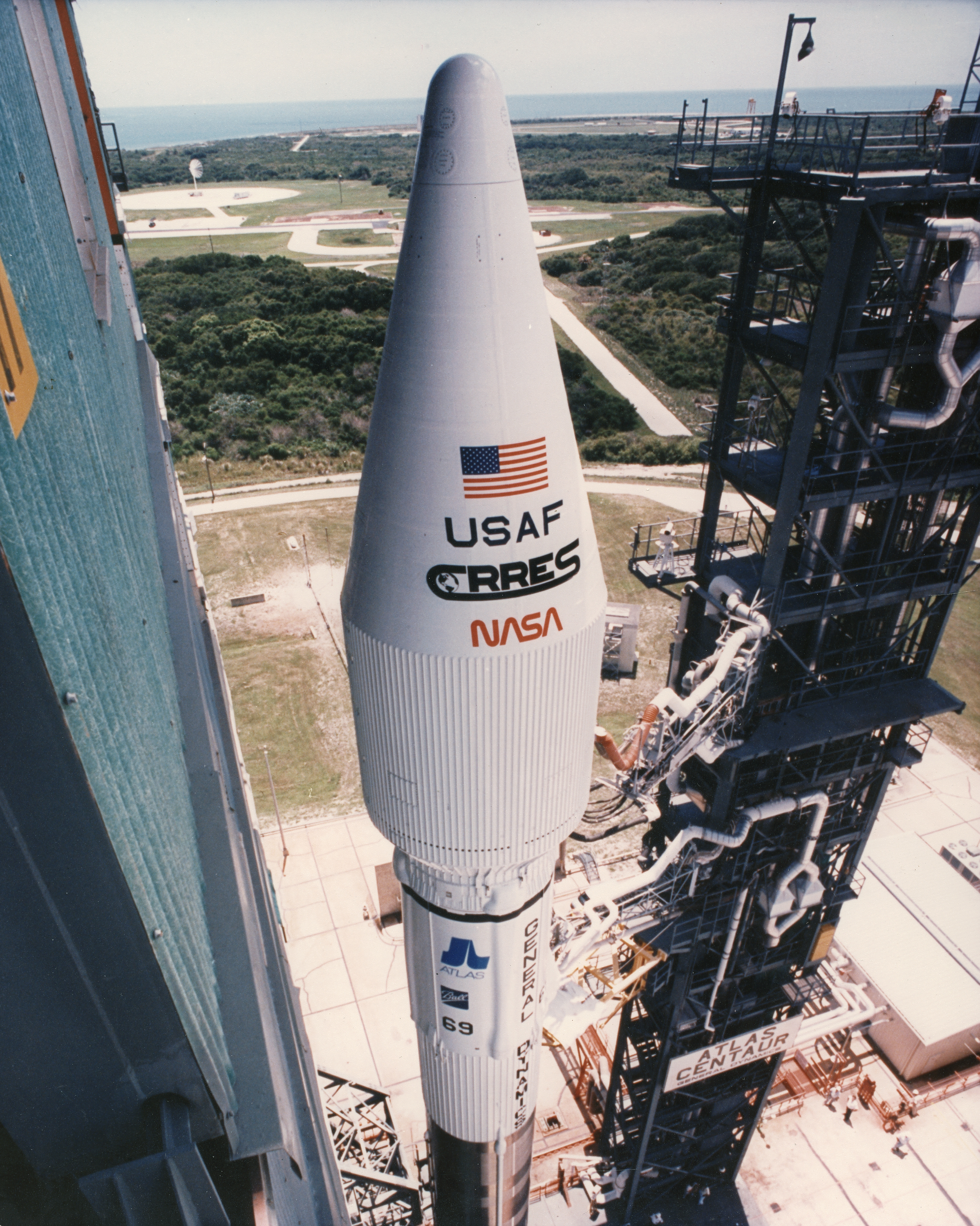
An Atlas I (serial number AC-69) on Pad 36B prior to launch of the CRRES satellite in 1990.

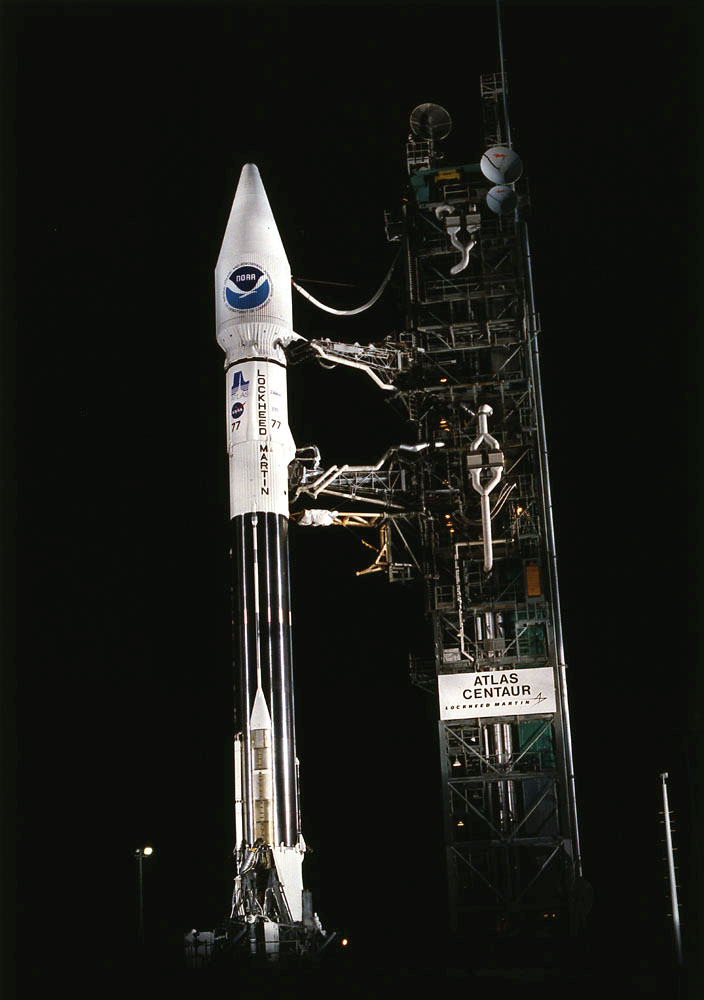
An Atlas I (serial number AC-77) on Pad 36B before the launch of the GOES-J weather satellite in 1995.

=== Atlas first stage ===
The first stage of the Atlas I was essentially a copy of the first stage of the Atlas G. It featured 2 LR-89-7 booster engines, one LR-105-7 sustainer engine, and 2 LR-101 vernier engines for roll control. The structure of the first stage consisted of stainless steel balloon tanks, much like earlier Atlas rockets. The sustainer and vernier engines were mounted onto this tank structure. The two booster engines, however, were mounted to their own cylindrical skirt structure attached to the bottom of the tanks. Each LR-89-7 had its own turbopump to feed propellants into the combustion chamber, but the two engines shared a single common gas generator. The complete sustainer and booster engine assembly was referred to as the MA-5.

The booster engines, along with their support structure and plumbing, would drop away in one piece during flight. As the sustainer engine was more efficient than the booster engines, dropping the booster engines increased the stage's performance. The LR-105-7 sustainer engine and LR-101 vernier engines shut down when all propellant in the first stage tanks was depleted, around four and a half minutes after liftoff. Toward the end of the first stage burn, the payload fairing was jettisoned.

Atlas I featured the same first-stage engines as the Atlas G. They would later be replaced on the Atlas II with better-performing engines derived from the RS-27.

=== Centaur upper stage ===
The upper stage of the Atlas I was the Centaur I stage, derived from earlier models of Centaur that also flew atop Atlas boosters. Centaur I featured two RL10-A-3A engines burning liquid hydrogen and liquid oxygen, making the stage extremely efficient. To help slow the boiloff of liquid hydrogen in the tanks, Centaur featured fiberglass insulation panels that were jettisoned 25 seconds after the first stage booster engines were jettisoned. Centaur I was the last version of the stage to feature separating insulation panels.

Centaur could be reignited to propel payloads to a geostationary transfer orbit, which was by far the most common flight profile on Atlas I. The maximum coast time of Centaur (essentially the stage's mission lifetime on orbit) was around 90 minutes when the stage was equipped with a long-coast kit. This kit included a larger battery, increased helium storage, additional shielding on the stage, and an extra bottle for hydrazine.

=== Star 48B third stage ===
General Dynamics offered an optional Star 48B third stage for Earth-departure launches. This small solid rocket motor would help give payloads a final push away from Earth shortly after separating from Centaur. Although Star motors flew on other Atlas rockets, they never flew on Atlas I.

=== Payload fairing ===
Two fairing models were available for the Atlas I:

- Medium, with a diameter of 3.3 m (11 ft), a height of 10.4 m (34 ft), and a mass of 1,409 kg (3,106 lb)
- Large, with a diameter of 4.2 m (14 ft), a height of 12.2 m (40 ft), and a mass of 2,087 kg (4,601 lb)

Both fairing models were also offered on the Atlas II series of rockets, and the Large model continued to fly until 2022 on the Atlas V.

The payload mass numbers for Atlas I were based on vehicles flying with a 4.2 m (14 ft)-diameter Large fairing. If a vehicle flew using a Medium fairing, the lower mass of the fairing would enable an approximately 135 kg (298 lb) increase in payload capacity to a geostationary transfer orbit.

== Launch history ==
Flight No.	Date/Time (GMT)	Serial Number		Payload	Outcome	Remarks
Flight No.	Date/Time (GMT)	Atlas	Centaur	Payload	Outcome	Remarks
1	July 25, 1990, 19:21	AC-69	5049	CRRES	Success	Maiden flight of Atlas I. The CRRES spacecraft operated for ~15 months when contact was lost. Issue was presumed to be on-board battery failure.
2	April 18, 1991, 23:30	AC-70	5050	Yuri 3H	Failure	RSO destruct at T+441 seconds. Due to management schedule and cost pressure during the postflight analysis, engineers made a quick but wrong conclusion that one Centaur engine failed to start due to debris lodged in the LH2 turbopump. The real problem was LH2 mixing with atmospheric nitrogen to form a plug of solid nitrogen in a Centaur engine valve. This resulted in the engine not developing thrust and the twin engine Centaur tumbled out of control. The problem would resurface again in Atlas AC-71.
3	March 14, 1992, 00:00	AC-72	5052	Galaxy 5	Success	
4	August 22, 1992, 22:40	AC-71	5051	Galaxy 1R	Failure	Centaur engine failure followed by RSO destruct. Just like the 1991 launch, this incident was caused by LH2 mixing with atmospheric nitrogen to form a plug of solid nitrogen in a Centaur engine valve. The condition was caused by an experimental procedure to increase performance by cooling the Centaur engines prior to ignition. The procedure was not fully tested under flight like conditions. This time management gave full authority to examine every possible cause until the root was found.
5	March 25, 1993, 21:38	AC-74	5054	UHF F-1	Failure	An improperly torqued set screw caused the Atlas sustainer engine to drop to 75% thrust starting at T+25 seconds. By booster staging at T+120 seconds, sustainer thrust was down to 60%. The payload was placed in an unusable orbit. This was the last failed launch involving an Atlas vehicle.
6	September 3, 1993, 11:17	AC-75	5055	UHF F-2 (USA-95)	Success	
7	April 13, 1994, 06:04	AC-73	5053	GOES-I (GOES-8)	Success	
8	June 24, 1994, 13:50	AC-76	5056	UHF F-3 (USA-104)	Success	
9	May 23, 1995, 05:52	AC-77	5057	GOES-J (GOES-9)	Success	
10	April 30, 1996, 04:31	AC-78	5058	BeppoSAX	Success	
11	April 25, 1997, 05:49	AC-79	5059	GOES-K (GOES-10)	Success	Final flight of Atlas I

== See also ==
- Comparison of orbital launchers families
- Atlas G
- Atlas H
- Atlas II
- Atlas (rocket family)
