= GOES 12 =

NOAA weather satellite

GOES-12
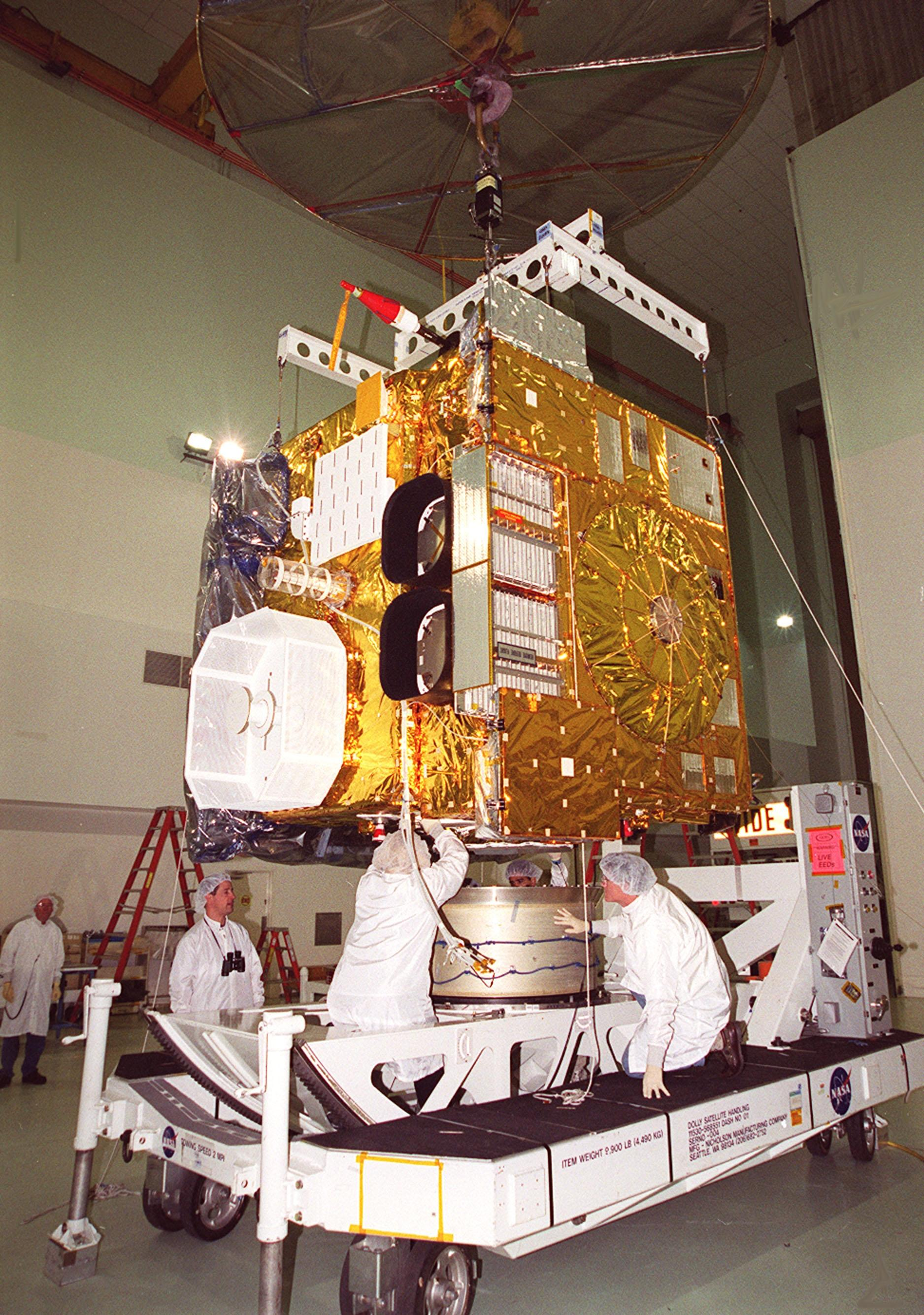
- GOES-M during processing
- Mission type: Weather satellite
- Operator: NOAA / NASA
- COSPAR ID: 2001-031A
- SATCAT no.: 26871
- Mission duration: 5 years (planned); 12 years (achieved)

Spacecraft properties
- Bus: LS-1300
- Manufacturer: Space Systems/Loral
- Launch mass: 2,279 kilograms (5,024 lb)

Start of mission
- Launch date: 23 July 2001, 07:23 UTC
- Rocket: Atlas IIA
- Launch site: Cape Canaveral SLC-36A
- Contractor: ILS

End of mission
- Disposal: Decommissioned
- Deactivated: August 16, 2013, 13:00 UTC

Orbital parameters
- Reference system: Geocentric
- Regime: Geostationary
- Longitude: 90° West (2001-2003); 75° West (2003-2010); 60° West (2010-2013)
- Slot: GOES-East (2003-2010); GOES-South (2010-2013)
- Eccentricity: 0.0007626
- Perigee altitude: 36,075 kilometres (22,416 mi)
- Apogee altitude: 36,140 kilometres (22,460 mi)
- Inclination: 5.6472°
- Period: 24 hours
- RAAN: 62.9959°
- Argument of perigee: 221.8848°
- Mean anomaly: 79.0106°
- Geostationary Operational Environmental Satellite (Second Generation)

GOES-12, known as GOES-M before becoming operational, is an American weather satellite, which is part of the US National Oceanic and Atmospheric Administration's Geostationary Operational Environmental Satellite system. It was launched on July 23, 2001, and spent its first 21 months in space as an on-orbit spare. From April 2003, the satellite took over the GOES-East position, providing coverage of the eastern half of the continental United States. In April 2010, GOES-East operations were taken over by GOES-13, and GOES-12 transitioned to the GOES-South location to devote time to South American imagery. It remained at this post until it was decommissioned on August 16, 2013 and subsequently boosted to a graveyard orbit.

== Launch ==
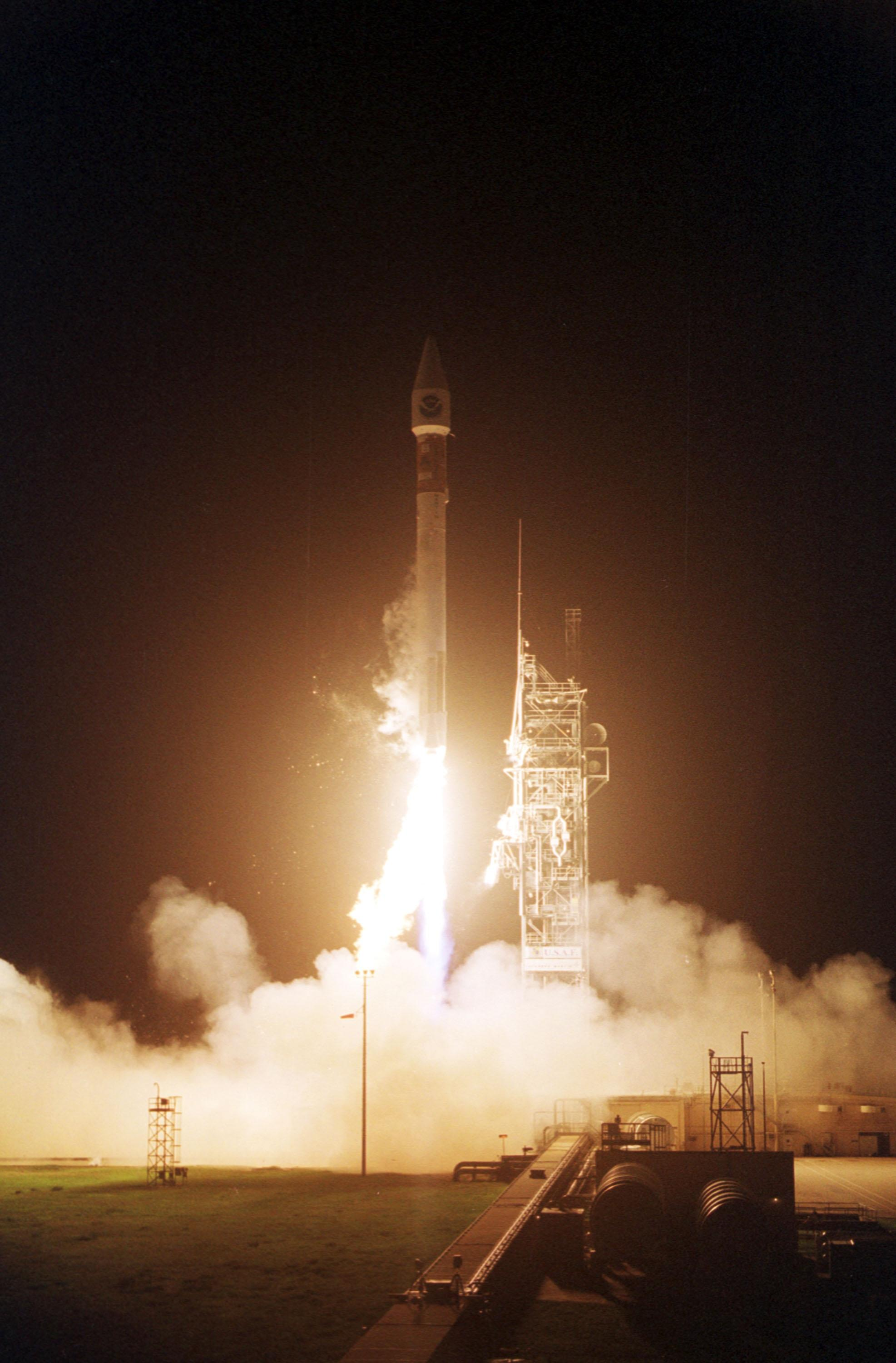
Launch of GOES-12

GOES-M was launched aboard an International Launch Services Atlas IIA rocket, flying from Space Launch Complex 36A at the Cape Canaveral Air Force Station. The launch occurred at 07:23 GMT on 23 July 2001, having previously been delayed eight days; seven due to a faulty controller in the second stage of the carrier rocket, and one to ensure that a lightning strike at SLC-36B had not caused any damage to the rocket. At launch, the satellite had a mass of 2,279 kilograms (5,024 lb), and an expected operational lifespan of five years, although it carried fuel for longer. It was built by Space Systems/Loral, based on the LS-1300 satellite bus, and was the last of five GOES-I series satellites to be launched.

== Operations ==
Following launch, it was positioned in geostationary orbit at a longitude of 90° West, where it underwent on-orbit testing, and was then stored until it was needed to replace an operational satellite. It served as an on-orbit spare until 2003, when it was called up to replace GOES-8, an older satellite which, while still operational, would have run out of fuel by the end of the year. Although GOES-11 was the next backup in line for activation, GOES-12 was used instead in order to test its Solar X-ray Imager. The Solar X-ray Imager failed in April 2013

== Thruster problems ==
Since December 2007, GOES-12 has experienced three thruster leaks during orbital adjustment manoeuvres, two of which led to major outages. The first of these occurred in December 2007, during an annual manoeuvre to reduce the inclination of the satellite's orbit. The faulty thruster was shut down, and the satellite was returned to its station by means of what was thought at the time to be a backup thruster. It was later discovered that the primary and backup thrusters had been wired the wrong way around, so it had actually switched from the backup system to the primary system, however this was believed to be unrelated to the failure. During this outage, GOES-10, a retired satellite which had been kept in orbit to provide coverage of South America, was briefly returned to service to cover for GOES-12.

Another outage occurred on 14 December 2008, when an inactive thruster leaked, sending the satellite out of control. The on-orbit-spare satellite, GOES-13, was brought online in case GOES-12 had to be replaced, and took over imagery from its storage location at 105° West while the fault was investigated. The problem cleared several weeks later, and the satellite was returned to operational status on 5 January 2009, with GOES-13 being returned to on-orbit storage.

Since then, several other leaks have occurred, however none has impacted operations. During a leak in May 2009, the GOES-13 satellite was again activated, however it did not need to take over operations. Because of the thruster problems, GOES-12 was replaced by GOES-13 in the GOES-East position.

GOES-12 was decommissioned on August 16, 2013.

== See also ==
- 2001 in spaceflight
- List of GOES satellites
