= 1985 United States–Canada tornado outbreak =

Record-breaking tornado outbreak

Coordinates: 43.777°N 79.130°W

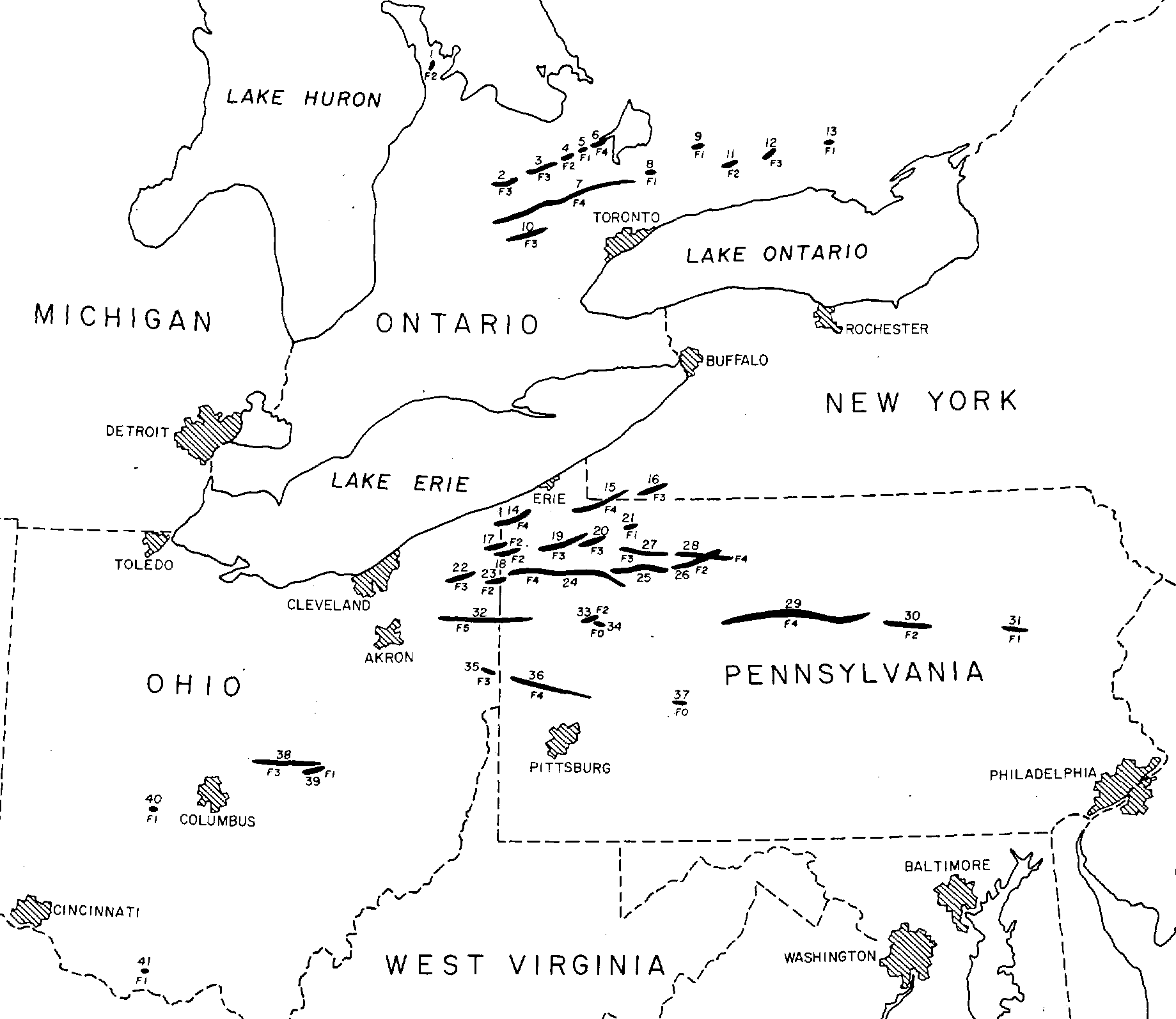
- Tracks of all tornadoes that touched down during the outbreak

Meteorological history
- Duration: May 31 – June 1, 1985

Tornado outbreak
- Tornadoes: 44 confirmed
- Max. rating: F5 tornado
- Duration: ~10 hours
- Highest winds: >261 mph (>420 km/h)

Overall effects
- Fatalities: 90
- Injuries: ≥875, over 1,000 reported
- Areas affected: New York, Ohio, Pennsylvania, Ontario
- Part of the tornado outbreaks of 1985

The 1985 United States–Canada tornado outbreak, referred to as the Barrie tornado outbreak in Canada, was a major tornado outbreak that occurred in the U.S. states of Ohio, Pennsylvania, and New York and the Canadian province of Ontario on May 31, 1985. In all, 43 tornadoes were recorded, including 14 in Ontario. Ninety people were killed, with 14 deaths occurring in Canada and 76 in the United States. It remains the largest and most intense tornado outbreak ever to hit the region, and the worst tornado outbreak in Pennsylvania history in terms of death toll and destruction.

== Meteorological synopsis ==
GOES 6 satellite loop on May 31, showing a line of thunderstorms developing across Canada, Ohio, Pennsylvania and New York during the tornado outbreak

The upper air pattern was conducive for a major severe weather event in the Great Lakes region on Friday, May 31, 1985. An unseasonably deep low-pressure system at 984 hPa crossed out of the Midwestern U.S. through the day, and then into the Upper Peninsula of Michigan. Very warm air surged in ahead of the system. Temperatures reached the upper twenties in Celsius (approximately 80–85 °F (27–29 °C)) across much of southern Ontario, in addition to high dew point levels. An unstable atmosphere (surface based lifted indices around minus 6) was the byproduct of this. Directional wind shear was also present in the warm sector of the storm, in addition to high helicity values and a vorticity maximum approaching the lower Great Lakes.

The situation was worsened by the presence of copious amounts of moisture, which allowed any storms that formed to become severe rather quickly. Also, this was supportive of the high-precipitation counterpart of the supercell thunderstorm. All of this added up to the distinct possibility of severe rotating storms, which would be messy, hard to see, and extremely dangerous. The final trigger came in the form of a trailing cold front behind the low. Severe thunderstorms and isolated tornadoes had already raked parts of the Midwestern United States (particularly in Iowa and Wisconsin) the day before, on May 30, associated with this same cold front.

The day started off on an active note with the warm front moving northwards. A possible tornado was reported near Leamington, Ontario, accompanied by golf ball-size hail from widespread severe thunderstorm activity in southwestern Ontario. Following the warm frontal passage, skies cleared rapidly and temperatures quickly began to rise. The cold front began crossing Lake Huron towards the noon hour, and with it several thunderstorms developed shortly after 1:30pm EDT, with the northernmost cell soon becoming the most dominant. Environment Canada issued a severe thunderstorm warning at 2:25pm for Bruce County (complementing the special weather statement issued early that morning). At around 2:50pm, an F2 tornado touched down briefly in the Lion's Head area (north of Wiarton) before moving out over Georgian Bay and dissipating.

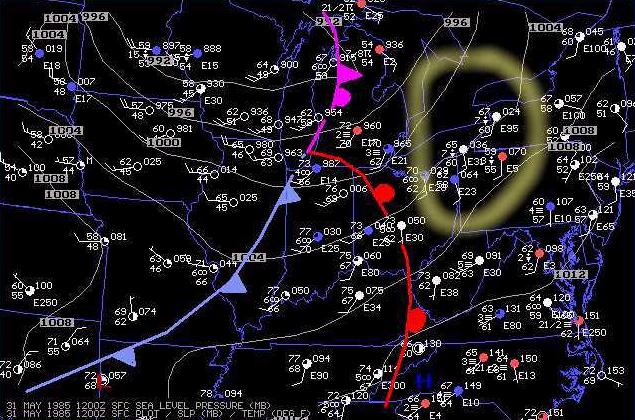
Surface map on the morning of May 31, 1985. Note the "triple-point" moving east toward southern Ontario.

At daybreak on May 31, 1985, a strong area of low pressure was centered near Duluth, Minnesota. A cold front extended south from the low across the western Great Lakes and then through Illinois and Missouri. The low tracked across the northern Great Lakes during the afternoon, while the cold front progressed eastward across Indiana and western Ohio. By late afternoon, temperatures had reached 87 °F (31 °C) in Cleveland, 82 degrees in Youngstown, and 85 °F (29 °C) in Erie, Pennsylvania. At the same time, conditions in the upper atmosphere continued to become more favorable for an outbreak of severe weather. By early afternoon, thunderstorms had developed in Ontario, just ahead of the cold front.

Despite a forecast for severe thunderstorms, the sun shone relentlessly for most of that Friday because of a fourth element: a stable air mass at about 2,000 feet above ground level, which served as a "lid" on the brew beneath. Then, at 2:50 p.m., the "lid" moved and huge cumulonimbus clouds, anvil-topped thunderheads, appeared seemingly out of nowhere all along the Ohio-Pennsylvania border. The storms quickly grew into powerful tornadic supercells.

== Confirmed tornadoes ==
Confirmed tornadoes by Fujita rating
| FU | F0 | F1 | F2 | F3 | F4 | F5 | Total |
|---|---|---|---|---|---|---|---|
| 0 | 4 | 12 | 7 | 12 | 8 | 1 | 44 |

List of confirmed tornadoes – Friday, May 31, 1985 (Note: All dates are based on the local time zone where the tornado touched down; however, all times are in Coordinated Universal Time for consistency.)
| F# | Location | County / Regional Municipality | State / Province | Time (UTC) | Path length | Summary |
|---|---|---|---|---|---|---|
| F0 | Leamington area | Essex | ON | Unknown | Unknown | |
| F2 | N of Wiarton | Bruce | ON | 1850 | 1 mile (1.6 km) | |
| F3 | S of Hopeville | Grey | ON | 1945–2000 | 10.6 miles (17.1 km) | |
| F3 | Mansfield area | Dufferin, Simcoe | ON | 2000–2030 | 25 miles (40 km) | Multiple homes were damaged. |
| F4 | N of Arthur to W of Mount Albert | Wellington, Dufferin, Simcoe, York | ON | 2015–2125 | 71.5 miles (115.1 km) | 6 deaths – See section on this tornado — Tornado devastated the town of Grand Valley, where numerous homes and three churches were completely destroyed. The roof of the local library was torn off and thrown 200 m (220 yd). A shopping center on the north side of Orangeville partially collapsed. Severe damage occurred in rural areas as well, including to hydro towers which were toppled by the tornado. This is the longest tracked tornado in Canadian history. |
| F0 | N of Alliston | Simcoe | ON | 2030 | 0.6 miles (0.97 km) | |
| F4 | NE of Monroe Center, OH to NW of Ivarea, PA | Ashtabula (OH), Erie (PA) | OH, PA | 2059 | 14 miles (23 km) | 12 deaths – In Ohio, trees and power poles were downed and 10 mobile homes were destroyed. Tornado crossed the state border and struck Albion, Pennsylvania, where an area up to 2 blocks wide and 10 blocks long was devastated. Many homes in town were completely leveled and 9 people were killed. Tornado struck two trailer parks in Cranesville, Pennsylvania, where three other people died. |
| F4 | Barrie | Simcoe | ON | 2100 | 6.2 miles (10.0 km) | 8 deaths – See article on this tornado |
| F3 | SE of Bundysburg to NE of Colebrooke | Trumbull, Ashtabula | OH | 2105 | 15 miles (24 km) | Forty homes were destroyed, along with multiple trucks, cars, and trailers. Numerous other structures were damaged. |
| F2 | SE of Linesville | Crawford | PA | 2110 | 4 miles (6.4 km) | 1 death — Touched down over the Pymatuning Reservoir and moved ashore, damaging numerous homes and campgrounds. The fatality occurred when a woman was crushed underneath a travel trailer. Two trailer homes were swept away, and a barn, a garage, and other structures were damaged. |
| F4 | SE of Cornelion, OH to SE of Eagle Rock, PA | Trumbull (OH), Mercer (PA), Crawford (PA), Venango (PA) | OH, PA | 2117 | 56.2 miles (90.4 km) | 16 deaths – Long track tornado touched down near the Ohio/Pennsylvania border and caused major damage in and around Jamestown, Atlantic, Cochranton, Cooperstown, Cherry Tree, and Hannasville. Atlantic was particularly hard hit, where a grain mill, a chair factory, a communications tower, a post office, a school building, and multiple homes were destroyed. Five people were killed there. Two homes and 11 trailers were destroyed at a trailer park in the Cherry Tree area, where five additional fatalities occurred. A poultry farm lost 160,000 birds. Numerous other structures including churches, mobile homes, a motel, and two taverns were damaged or destroyed along the path. Tornado caused a total of $5,000,000 in damage. |
| F3 | S of Saegertown to NE of Centerville | Crawford | PA | 2123 | 23 miles (37 km) | 2 deaths – This tornado struck a ranger's home at the Army Corps of Engineers Station, with a car being rolled 100 feet (30 m) at this location. The fatalities occurred at Centerville. |
| F4 | SE of Waterford, PA to SE of Panama, NY | Erie (PA), Warren (PA), Chautauqua (NY) | PA, NY | 2125 | 28 miles (45 km) | In Pennsylvania, over 50 buildings were destroyed in the Corry and Elgin areas. One farm was completely leveled in the area, with nothing but a silo left standing. The farmhouse was seen airborne by eyewitnesses. A dump truck was tossed over a house and a wagon was thrown over a mile. 30 head of cattle were killed in the area. Tornado crossed into New York and traversed rural areas before dissipating. |
| F2 | NE of Dorset, OH to W of Steamburg, PA | Ashtabula (OH), Crawford (PA) | OH, PA | 2128 | 10 miles (16 km) | Several homes and farm buildings were torn apart along the path. |
| F1 | Wagner Lake area | Durham | ON | 2140 | Unknown | |
| F1 | Reaboro area | Peterborough | ON | 2205 | Unknown | |
| F3 | S of Centerville | Crawford | PA | 2212 | 8 miles (13 km) | Ten homes, a trailer, and several barns were destroyed. A $500,000 state transportation building was destroyed as well. |
| F3 | Alma to Hilsburgh | Wellington | ON | 2215–2230 | 20.6 miles (33.2 km) | Damage was mostly confined to outbuildings. |
| F2 | Ida area | Peterborough | ON | 2220 | Unknown | |
| F3 | Rice Lake area | Northumberland | ON | 2225 | Unknown | |
| F3 | E of Jamestown | Chautauqua | NY | 2225 | 13 miles (21 km) | Homes near Busti, Harmony, Carroll, and Kiantone were torn apart or destroyed. |
| F5 | W of Newton Falls, OH to W of Mercer, PA | Portage (OH), Trumbull (OH), Mercer (PA) | OH, PA | 2230 | 47 miles (76 km) | 18 deaths – See article on this tornado |
| F4 | SE of Shamburg to SW of Owls Nest | Venango, Forest | PA | 2230 | 29 miles (47 km) | 7 deaths – Around 700 structures were damaged along the path, 125 of which were destroyed. At a drug and alcohol rehab center, 14 of 17 trailers were destroyed. The fatalities took place near German Hill, three of which occurred when a car was thrown 100 yards (91 m) from Pennsylvania Route 36. |
| F1 | S of Pittsfield | Warren | PA | 2230 | 5 miles (8.0 km) | |
| F1 | Minto area | Hastings | ON | 2235 | Unknown | |
| F2 | SW of Chaffee to E of Halsey | Forest, Elk, McKean | PA | 2250 | 19 miles (31 km) | Damage was mostly limited to trees. |
| F1 | SW of London | Madison | OH | 2306 | 0.5 miles (0.80 km) | |
| F3 | N of Johnstown to W of West Carlisle | Licking, Coshocton | OH | 2315 | 29 miles (47 km) | 1 death – Several homes and buildings were destroyed, and one person was killed near Fallsburg. Caused $5,000,000 in damage. |
| F3 | S of Tidioute | Warren | PA | 2330 | 17 miles (27 km) | 32 buildings were damaged or destroyed. |
| F4 | N of Sabula to NW of Jersey Shore | Clearfield, Cameron, Clinton, Centre | PA | 2335 | 69 miles (111 km) | Tornado carved a massive path through Moshannon State Forest, downing thousands of trees. The tornado went through Parker Dam State Park in Clearfield County. 13 homes were destroyed, mostly near the beginning of the path. |
| F2 | S of Salem to W of East Palestine | Columbiana | OH | 2335 | 15 miles (24 km) | Many homes and farm buildings were destroyed. |
| F1 | NE of Frazeysburg | Muskingum, Coshocton | OH | 2350 | 11 miles (18 km) | |
| F2 | SW of Dotter | Venango | PA | 2354 | 6 miles (9.7 km) | A trailer and five homes were destroyed or badly damaged. A man and his son were badly injured when another trailer was destroyed. Caused $243,000 in damage. |
| F0 | S of Emlenton | Venango, Clarion | PA | 2356 | 5 miles (8.0 km) | |
| F4 | NW of Brookston to E of Glen Hazel | Warren, McKean, Elk | PA | 0000 | 29 miles (47 km) | 4 deaths – Severe damage along the path, especially in the Kane area, where three businesses were destroyed, the schools sustained $3,000,000 in damage, and 99 homes were left uninhabitable. A church in the area had only its front steps left, and many vehicles were crushed under collapsed garages. Caused a total of $15,000,000 in damage. |
| F3 | NW of Darlington to E of Sarverville | Beaver, Butler | PA | 0010 | 39 miles (63 km) | 9 deaths – The Big Beaver Borough Shopping Plaza was destroyed near Beaver Falls. Two people were killed at this location, and over 100 cars were damaged or destroyed in the parking lot. 16 antique cars were destroyed in a garage nearby. At the intersection of highways 588 and 65, the tornado destroyed three homes, a drive-in theater, a service station, and two other businesses. A van was picked up from I-79 and tossed a 440 yd (400 m) by the tornado. The family inside was ejected from the vehicle but survived. A trailer park was leveled in the Evans City area, and 40 homes were destroyed between Callery and Mars. Witnesses in the area reported pink insulation and sheet metal falling from the sky prior to the tornado. |
| F1 | Grippen Lake area | Leeds and Grenville | ON | 0010 | Unknown | |
| F1 | W of East Sparta | Stark | OH | 0045 | 0.2 miles (0.32 km) | |
| F1 | SW of Cedar Mills | Adams | OH | 0105 | 2 miles (3.2 km) | |
| F3 | NW of Bastress to NE of Springton | Lycoming, Union, Northumberland | PA | 0125 | 19 miles (31 km) | 6 deaths – At the Hidden Creek Campground, 48 of the 60 trailers were destroyed, with the rest being damaged. An 83-year-old woman survived the tornado when it threw her mobile home off an 80-foot (24 m) cliff and into a tree. In Union County, the tornado destroyed three mobile homes, 8 permanent homes, and 18 vehicles. Five other homes were damaged in the area. In Northumberland County, the tornado damaged or destroyed two businesses, 140 mobile homes, 77 permanent homes, a church, 9 silos, and 28 barns. Thousands of trees were snapped along the path. |
| F0 | E of Penn Run | Indiana | PA | 0153 | 6 miles (9.7 km) | |
| F1 | N of Norfolk | St. Lawrence | NY | 0230 | 5 miles (8.0 km) | |
| F1 | NW of Freeland | Luzerne | PA | 0245 | 11 miles (18 km) | |
| F1 | NW of Tobyhanna | Monroe | PA | 0405 | 0.2 miles (0.32 km) | |
Sources: Tornado History Project Storm Data—May 31, 1985 Grazulis (1985)

=== Grand Valley–Tottenham, Ontario ===
Grand Valley–Tottenham, Ontario
- A view of the completely destroyed Grand Valley Public Library, following the tornado. Amaranth Street, the central street of Grand Valley, can be seen on the right.

Meteorological history
- Formed: May 31, 1985, 4:15 p.m. EDT (UTC–04:00)
- Dissipated: May 31, 1985, 5:25 p.m. EDT (UTC–04:00)
- Duration: 1 hour, 10 minutes

F4 tornado
- on the Fujita scale
- Max width: 600 m (0.37 mi; 660 yd)
- Path length: 115 km (71 mi) (Record continuous path length in Canada)
- Highest winds: 207–260 mph (333–418 km/h)

Overall effects
- Fatalities: 4
- Injuries: 69
- Areas affected: Wellington, Dufferin, and Simcoe Counties, Ontario

A rotating storm system, which had initially developed east of Clinton, Ontario, moved quickly to the northeast. Approaching the northern outskirts of Arthur, the storm system produced the longest-tracked tornado in Canadian history at approximately 4:15 p.m. Initially, many power lines and hydro towers were destroyed by tornado, including those used to deliver electricity from the Bruce Nuclear Generating Station to the Greater Toronto Area. Paralleling Ontario County Road 109 and destroying several properties, the tornado quickly widened, intensified, and reached violent proportions by the time it reached the small crossroads community of Grand Valley, just before 4:30 p.m. By this point, the tornado's damage path had increased to approximately 200 metres (660 ft) wide.

The tornado caused severe damage in the small town, where two people were killed. An elderly woman visiting from Scotland died as the home she was sheltering in was destroyed, and a man was killed in his pickup truck on a nearby farm. The worst damage was found along Amaranth Street (running west to east, parallel to the tornado's path) where the Grand Valley Public Library, three churches, including the Grand Valley Church of Christ, and many other masonry-style homes were severely damaged or destroyed. In Grand Valley, approximately sixty structures in total sustained damage. The most severe was on the north side of Amaranth Street, where some homes and buildings exhibited what was described by surveyors as "classic F4 damage". The roof of the Grand Valley Public Library was found 200 m (220 yd) away, deposited onto a nearby house.

Continuing eastward through open country, the tornado brushed the northern outskirts of Orangeville (more specifically the community of Mono) about fifteen minutes later. Here the southern portion of the Mono Shopping Plaza was near-completely swept, injuring 67 people — one of them seriously. The tornado then caused extensive damage to approximately fifty buildings about 2 km (1.2 mi) south of the town of Tottenham at around 5:00 p.m.; many of these buildings were only recently built. Two more people died here, as an elderly man was crushed under an equipment shed on his farm and a woman was killed in her home. The tornado continued to the east-northeast, crossing Highway 400 into the York region. Passing to the between the cities of Newmarket and Bradford, the tornado lifted west of Mount Albert at 5:25 p.m.

With a path length of around 115 km (71 mi), the Grand Valley–Tottenham tornado was officially determined to be the longest-tracked tornado in Canadian history; a record that still stands today. When the earliest tornado track maps were published in 1986, the official path of the tornado extended almost twice as far towards the Peterborough area. In more recent years, this theory has been disproven; the supercell that produced this tornado was a cyclic one, and it dropped two separate F2 tornadoes following the dissipation of the Grand Valley tornado.

=== Barrie, Ontario ===
Barrie, Ontario
- A view of the rain-wrapped tornado in Barrie

Meteorological history
- Formed: May 31, 1985, 5:00 p.m. EDT (UTC–04:00)
- Dissipated: Unknown
- Duration: Unknown

F4 tornado
- on the Fujita scale
- Max width: 600 m (0.37 mi; 660 yd)
- Path length: 15 km (9.3 mi)
- Highest winds: 207–260 mph (333–418 km/h)

Overall effects
- Fatalities: 8
- Injuries: 155
- Areas affected: Simcoe County, Ontario; particularly Barrie, Ontario

==== Preceding tornadoes ====
At about the same time the Lion's Head tornado dissipated, two very severe thunderstorms had developed (that likely owed their inception, at least partially, to lake breeze convergence): one to the east of Clinton and another farther to the north, in the Walkerton area. These two developing supercells would grow into a pair of devastating storms within the next hour—likely the most prolific tornado producers in Canadian history to date.

The second tornado of the day touched down south of Hopeville around 3:45pm, causing some localized F3 damage along its track. This tornado lifted after a 17-kilometre (11 mi) path, but another tornado quickly formed just north of Corbetton, in northern Dufferin County, at about 4:15pm. It stayed over rural areas for most of its 40-kilometre (25 mi) path, however a few homes (especially in the Terra Nova and Mansfield area) sustained F3 damage. It has been disputed whether this path was of two separate tornadoes or just one. Shortly after this tornado dissipated, there were hints of another brief touchdown near Angus in the Blackdown Park training area of Canadian Forces Base Borden (north of Alliston). The next tornado was the last of this storm, but was the most infamous one. It formed in southern Simcoe County (Essa Township), less than 10 kilometres (6.2 mi) southwest of Highway 400 and the Barrie city limits.

==== Tornado summary ====
At approximately 4:00 pm, all electrical power in Barrie went out, as the Grand Valley/Tottenham tornado took out the main hydro transformers, southwest of the city (LeGrand, 1990). Few residents were aware of the tornado, but many people were let off work 30–45 minutes before the storm hit due to these power outages. Had this not happened, the death toll would have been higher. The intensifying tornado first obliterated a pine tree forest plantation. Some 10-metre (33 ft) high trees were snapped at the 2-metre (6 ft 7 in) level. At this point the damage path was about 600 metres (2,000 ft) wide, moving steadily towards the east-northeast. It then entered the southern part of Barrie shortly before 5:00 pm. Visibility was very low as the tornado was cloaked in heavy rain and dust. Extensive F3 and localized F4 damage occurred to an entire square block of homes in the Crawford Street and Patterson Road subdivision. Five people were killed in the area as some homes there were not well-built, and thus collapsed after being pushed off their foundations. Most of the fatalities occurred in homes with no basements, where head and chest trauma resulted from an increased exposure to flying debris.

Next, the tornado hit an industrial complex (known then as Molson Park). One person died at a tire retreading facility while at least fifteen other businesses were damaged or destroyed (Bruineman, 2010). Steel I-beams were twisted out of shape, and splinters of wood were found embedded into nearby concrete walls. The tornado then proceeded to cross Highway 400 at Essa Road (former Highway 27) Interchange, just missing the Barrie Racetrack to the south. The grandstand was heavily damaged and several barns nearby were destroyed. A man was killed after he was sucked out of his parked car in an adjacent lot (Bruineman, 2010). Several vehicles traveling on Highway 400 were tossed into the ditch, their drivers escaping with only minor injuries. Highway guard rails were found wrapped around telephone poles nearby. Many cars were also found with puncture holes in their frames, owing to the flying debris. As the tornado crossed the highway, it moved into the Allandale subdivision.

Many homes sustained severe damage there, with much of their upper floors missing. By this time the tornado's path had narrowed to about 300 metres (980 ft). The track moved from Debra Crescent to Joanne Court with more extensive damage. Near Tower Crescent, the path narrowed to a comparatively small 50 metres (160 ft). On Briar Road, homes sustained only minor damage, indicating that the tornado had weakened, but the next road east, Trillium Crescent, sustained heavy damage indicating that it had strengthened once again. Four warehouses near Highway 11 were ripped apart. It then hit the Tollendal Woods and Minets Point area, taking out the Brentwood Marina and a nearby subdivision. A boy was killed in this area while trying to bicycle home (Bruineman, 2010). More than thirty boats, accompanied by their concrete moorings, were tossed into Lake Simcoe and never to be recovered. The tornado then moved out over Kempenfelt Bay where it became a waterspout for a brief time before weakening out completely. It came very close to the opposite shore, but no damage was reported there. Large quantities of debris from the city were later found floating in the bay, however. Despite the tornado's relatively short path length (10 kilometres (6.2 mi)), eight people died in Barrie with 155 injured, and as many as 300 homes were damaged or destroyed.

=== Newton Falls–Niles, Ohio/Wheatland–Hermitage, Pennsylvania ===
Newton Falls–Niles, Ohio/Wheatland–Hermitage, Pennsylvania
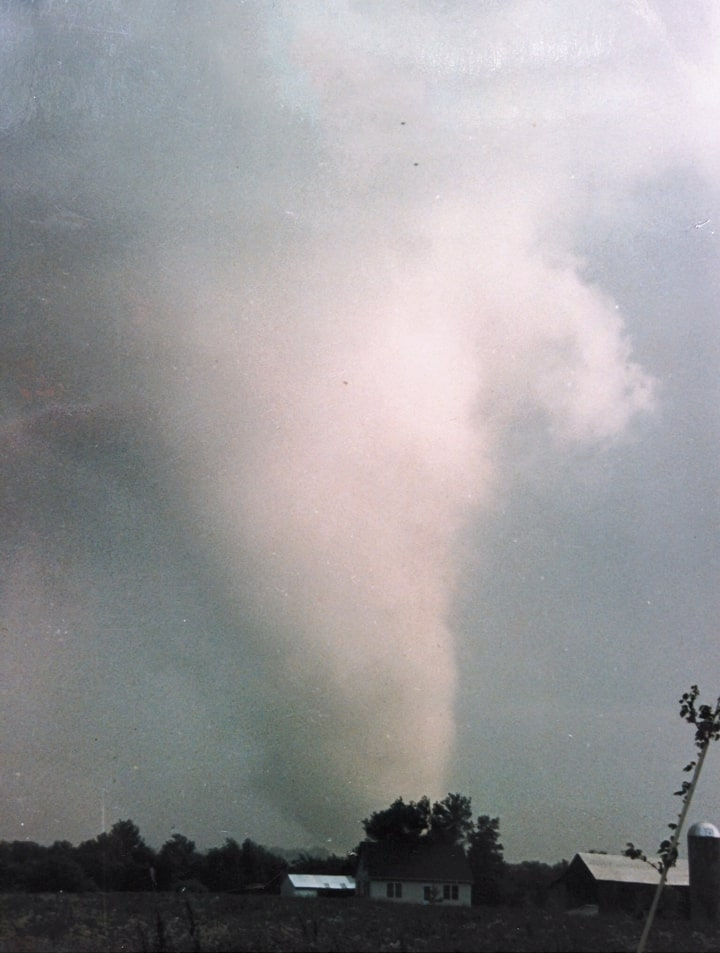
- The F5 tornado, seen shortly after exiting Wheatland, Pennsylvania

Meteorological history
- Formed: May 31, 1985, 6:30 p.m. EDT (UTC–04:00)
- Dissipated: May 31, 1985, 7:30 p.m. EDT (UTC–04:00)
- Duration: 1 hour

F5 tornado
- on the Fujita scale
- Max width: 450 yd (410 m; 0.26 mi)
- Path length: 47 mi (76 km)
- Highest winds: 261–318 mph (420–512 km/h)

Overall effects
- Fatalities: 18
- Injuries: 310
- Areas affected: Newton Falls and Niles, Ohio; Wheatland and Hermitage, Pennsylvania

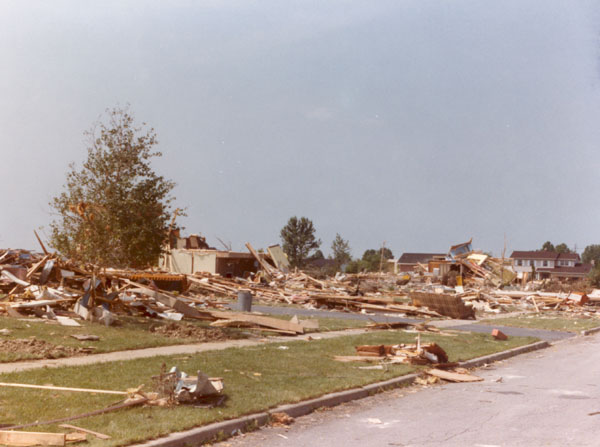
F3 level damage in Newton Falls, Ohio.

This violent tornado began in eastern Ohio and tore directly through the towns of Niles, Ohio, and Wheatland, Pennsylvania, producing F5 damage at both locations. The tornado killed 18 people, injured 310 others, and was the most violent and deadly of the 44 recorded that day. Registering F5 on the Fujita scale, it remains the easternmost recorded F5/EF5 tornado in the United States (as of 2025), the only F5 in Pennsylvania history, the last F5 in Ohio to date, and was also the most violent tornado reported in the United States in 1985.

It first touched down in Ohio near the Ravenna Arsenal in Portage County around 6:30 PM EDT. Gathering strength, it moved quickly into Newton Falls in Trumbull County causing F3 to F4 damage through much of the town. While nearly 400 homes were heavily damaged or destroyed, no fatalities were recorded in Newton Falls, due to the storm-readiness of local authorities and its tornado siren. Additional homes were completely destroyed as the tornado struck the north side of Lordstown. Continuing east, the tornado reached F5 intensity as it tore through the north side of Niles. Hundreds of homes in the Niles area were destroyed, including several homes with anchor bolts that were swept away with the debris scattered downwind. The Niles Park Plaza shopping center was completely leveled and partially swept away at F5 intensity, with several of the fatalities occurring at that location. Steel girders were buckled at the shopping center, and a nearby retirement home and a skating rink were leveled as well. As the tornado struck an industrial area in Niles, large 30 ft (9.1 m) tall metal petroleum storage tanks (each weighing 75,000 lb (34,000 kg)) were torn from where they were anchored and thrown, some of which were tossed or bounced considerable distances. One of the tanks was found in the middle of a road, 60 yd (55 m) from where it originated. The tornado weakened slightly as it tore through the north side of Hubbard and through the center of Coalburg, though many additional homes were still leveled in those areas.

As the tornado crossed the state line and reached Wheatland, Pennsylvania, it was a half-mile (0.8 km) wide and had regained F5 strength. A steel-frame trucking plant in Wheatland was obliterated and partially swept away at F5 intensity, as the building's steel girder frame was mangled into a pile and pushed off of the foundation. At nearby Wheatland Sheet and Tube, sections of pavement were scoured from the parking lot, and shards of sheet metal and routing slips were left wedged beneath the remaining asphalt. Ninety-five percent of Wheatland's business and residential area were destroyed. According to Storm Data from the National Weather Service, the destruction of the town "resembled that of a bombed-out battle field." Continuing east, the tornado weakened slightly but remained violent as it struck Hermitage, damaging or destroying 71 homes along with the town's airport, destroying several hangars and planes. A wing from one of the planes was found 10 mi (16 km) away in Mercer. Another trucking steel processing plant was heavily damaged in Hermitage as well. The tornado then destroyed 15 homes and damaged 30 others in the Greenfield area before finally dissipating.

In Ohio, it was the deadliest tornado since the Xenia F5 during the Super Outbreak of April 3, 1974. The tornado was also captured on camera by several residents.

== Storm timeline and aftermath ==
=== United States ===
The outbreak lasted roughly from just before 2 p.m. EDT, when the first tornado touched down in Wiarton, Ontario, until just after 12 a.m. EDT when the last reported tornado struck Tobyhanna, Pennsylvania. The peak of the outbreak took place during the early evening hours where the strongest and deadliest tornadoes formed across western Pennsylvania and eastern Ohio.

The first of two F4 tornadoes to affect Erie County touched down just west of the Pennsylvania state line around 5 p.m. The tornado moved across the northwestern tip of Crawford County and then entered Erie County near Pennside. After causing considerable damage there, the tornado slammed into Albion leveling the town. A ten-block area was completely destroyed, with nine people being killed. The tornado killed three more people in Cranesville before lifting. There were also 82 injuries, and a total of 309 destroyed buildings. The second F4 to affect Erie County touched down between Wattsburg and Corry in eastern Erie County. It clipped the northwestern tip of Warren County, before crossing into New York, where it did some damage in Chautauqua County, before dissipating near Panama. The tornado stayed on the ground for 28 miles (45 km), but resulted in no fatalities.

The most famous tornado of this outbreak touched down in Portage County, Ohio, near the Ravenna National Guard Armory at about 6:30 p.m. and cut a 47-mile (76 km) path through Newton Falls, Niles, and Hubbard, Ohio, before entering Pennsylvania. This was the only F5 in the United States in 1985, and the deadliest Ohio tornado since the Xenia F5 during the 1974 Super Outbreak.

The outbreak took the lives of 90 people in the United States and Canada, the highest number of fatalities for an outbreak since the 1974 Super Outbreak and a mark that stood until the 2011 Super Outbreak.

==== Other U.S. tornadoes ====
Described as "one of the most impressive tornadic events of the 20th century" by meteorologist and researcher Thomas Grazulis, a massive, high-end F4 tornado tracked for 69 miles (111 kilometers) through dense forest in central Pennsylvania. Near the beginning of its path, a few homes were heavily damaged and some outbuildings were destroyed, but otherwise, the tornado passed entirely through uninhabited areas in the Moshannon and Sproul State Forests. Surveyors estimated the damage path to be at least 2.5 miles (4.0 km), with more than 90,000 trees obliterated. The tornado also generated tremors that set off local seismometers, and even the primitive WSR-57 weather radar in State College picked up a distinct reflectivity spike (also known as a "debris ball"), due to the large amount of trees and other vegetation being uprooted and lifted into the air as the tornado passed through the forest north of Interstate 80.

The second-deadliest tornado in Pennsylvania history touched down in Trumbull County, Ohio, just yards away from the Pennsylvania state line, and tracked for 56.2 miles (90.4 km) through northwestern Pennsylvania. Rated F4, the tornado struck Jamestown in northwestern Mercer County, Atlantic and Cochranton in southern Crawford County, and Cooperstown in northern Venango County, narrowly missing Oil City to the north before dissipating south of Tionesta in western Forest County.

One deadly tornado impacted the Pittsburgh metropolitan area. Rated F3, the tornado tracked for 39 miles (63 km) through northern Beaver County and southern Butler County in southwestern Pennsylvania, approximately 20 mi (32 km) north of Pittsburgh, narrowly missing the northernmost suburbs of the city. In Big Beaver, two people were killed when the Big Beaver Plaza was destroyed, along with more than 100 vehicles in the parking lot. Across the Beaver River from the shopping plaza, 16 antique vehicles were destroyed in a garage on River Road. Despite being rebuilt in 1987, business never recovered at the shopping plaza, which sits vacant today. In North Sewickley Township, the tornado struck the junction of PA 65 and PA 588, destroying the Spotlight 88 Drive-In Theater, a gas station, three homes and two other businesses. The drive-in theater was never rebuilt, and the site is used as Spotlight 88 Flea Market today. In Butler County, the tornado crossed Interstate 79, where it blew a southbound van a quarter of a mile (400 m) off the highway. The family of four inside the van was ejected, but survived. A trailer park near Evans City was destroyed, as was another trailer on Watters Station Road, where two people were killed. Near Callery, 40 homes were destroyed. People in the area reported pieces of sheet metal and shreds of pink insulation falling from the sky shortly before the tornado arrived. Near the end of its path, the tornado killed a babysitter and a young girl near Saxonburg, before dissipating near Sarver. In all, this tornado killed nine people, injured 120, and caused more than $10,000,000 of damage in Beaver County.

Three tornadoes were reported in New York: two in Chautauqua County, and one in St. Lawrence County. The first tornado, rated F4, crossed into New York from Erie County, Pennsylvania, and tracked for 28 miles (45 km) (16 mi (26 km) in Pennsylvania, 12 mi (19 km) in New York), striking Clymer and Harmony in southwestern Chautauqua County before dissipating. The second tornado, rated F3, touched down in southeastern Chautauqua County and tracked for 13 miles (21 km), striking Kiantone, Carroll and Poland, and narrowly missing Jamestown to the east. The third tornado, rated F1, touched down in northern St. Lawrence County, and was produced by a supercell that crossed into the North Country from Ontario. This tornado tracked for five miles, passing north of Norfolk.

In all, 65 people were killed in Pennsylvania, which remains the highest death toll in a tornado outbreak in Pennsylvania history.

=== Canada ===
Most of the tornadic activity at this point moved into southern Ontario producing more tornadoes (some of which were significant). These tornadoes formed around the Highway 7 corridor between Lindsay to Madoc (Joe and Leduc, 1993) near the towns of Wagner Lake (F1 at 5:40 pm), Reaboro (F1 at 6:05 pm), Ida (F2 at 6:20 pm), Rice Lake (F3 at 6:25 pm), and Minto (F1 at 6:35 pm). Most of these tornadoes had conversely shorter paths than the earlier tornadoes, likely as a result of the parent thunderstorms beginning to weaken. In addition, they did not receive as much media attention as the previous tornadoes (those earlier storms were grouped collectively by the media as comprising "The Barrie Tornado"), probably a result of the fact that they didn't have the opportunity to cause as much damage.

Even so, at the time these more eastern tornadoes were touching down, a final, more isolated supercell developed near Milverton in eastern Perth County which spawned a tornado at 6:15 pm. On the ground for approximately fifteen minutes, this tornado tracked a 33-kilometre (21 mi) path of sporadic F3 damage (mainly to outbuildings) from Alma east-northeast towards the Hillsburgh area. Its path was almost parallel to the Grand Valley/Tottenham tornado only a couple of hours earlier.

== Aftermath ==
Following the event, ninety people were dead and 281 were injured, as close to a thousand businesses and homes were wiped out (Grazulis, 2001). Still, hundreds more were left out of work largely as a result of the massive damage sustained to the industrial complex in Barrie. Of the 605 homes in the path of these tornadoes, approximately one-third were rendered uninhabitable. One of the more sobering instances was that of a blind Orangeville-area man whose home suffered a similar fate, following a painstaking 20 years of construction (LeGrand, 1990). Nevertheless, in the hours following the event, soldiers from "B" and "F" Companies, The Grey and Simcoe Foresters and from Canadian Forces Base in Borden assembled in Barrie to assist in the canvassing of the worst affected areas of the city. Coincidentally, the latter had barely escaped a tornado itself that day, it having momentarily touched down in the Blackdown Park Training Area before lifting again and passing over hundreds of married quarters. In addition, the Grand Valley library (levelled by an F4 tornado) donated books, and wooden pallets were donated by a local trucking company in Barrie so survivors could salvage their possessions.

Most of Grand Valley was completely rebuilt by August 1986, a little over a year later. The textile plant, Albarrie (one of twelve factories completely destroyed by the Barrie tornado) opened its doors once again within the next year. Even so, to this day there are still hints from the past of the tornadoes that day. Some of the wooded areas affected are still a twisted mess, and some random debris still remains scattered in the bush to the east of Highway 400 in Barrie. In the end, the price tag from the severe weather in Ontario alone reached an estimated $200 million (in unadjusted Canadian dollars, 1985). Correlating to nearly $390 million in Canadian dollars by today's standard, it was a very expensive disaster indeed (LeGrand, 1990). This tornado outbreak ranks among the Southern Ontario tornado outbreak of 2005 and the 1998 Ice Storm as one of the most costly weather disasters to strike Ontario. Climatologists have estimated that the probability of a severe weather outbreak as widespread and catastrophic as this one, occurring this far north and east in North America once again is one in 75,000 (Grazulis, 2001).

On the evening of May 31, 1985, an F1 tornado touched down far to the east of the other twisters from that day at around 8:10 p.m., near Grippen Lake, about 35 km (22 mi) northeast of Kingston, Ontario. This makes it a "14th lost and found tornado".

== See also ==
- List of North American tornadoes and tornado outbreaks
- List of F5 and EF5 tornadoes
- 1953 Sarnia tornado outbreak
- 2018 United States–Canada tornado outbreak
