= 1985 Niles–Wheatland tornado =

F5 tornado in Ohio and Pennsylvania, U.S.

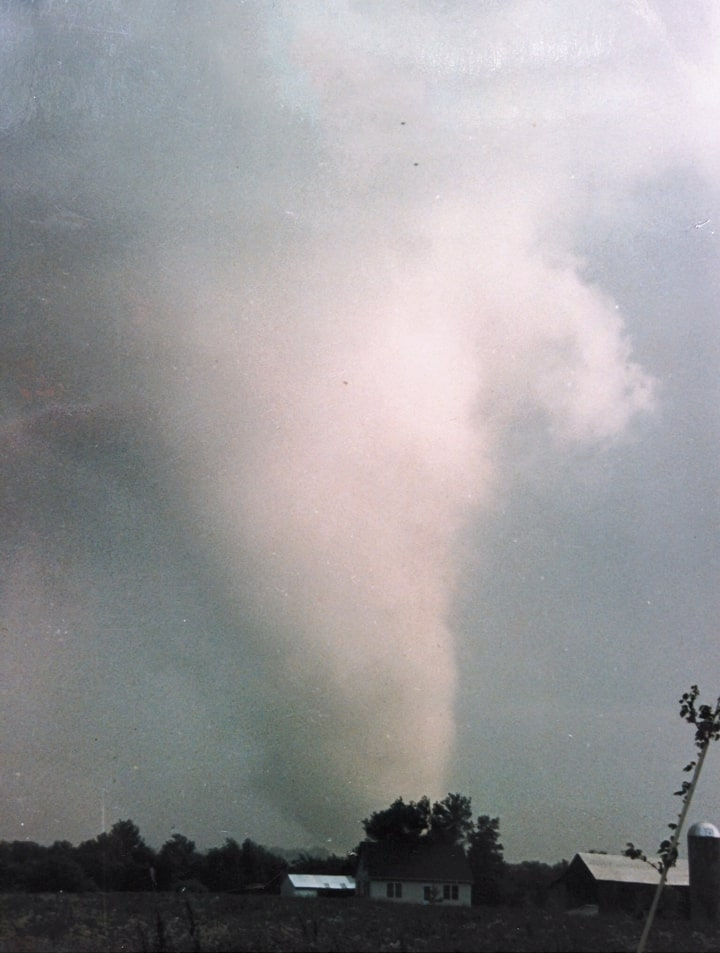
- The tornado shortly after leaving Wheatland, Pennsylvania

Meteorological history
- Formed: May 31, 1985, 6:30 p.m. EDT (UTC−04:00)
- Dissipated: May 31, 1985, 7:30 p.m. EDT (UTC−04:00)
- Duration: 1 hour

F5 tornado
- on the Fujita scale
- Max width: 450 yards (410 m)
- Path length: 47 miles (76 km)
- Highest winds: ≥261 mph (≥420 km/h)

Overall effects
- Fatalities: 18
- Injuries: 310
- Damage: >$250 million (1985 USD)
- Areas affected: Newton Falls, Niles, Hakes Corners, Coalburg, Hermitage Wheatland, Hoagland
- Part of the 1985 United States-Canada tornado outbreak and Tornadoes of 1985

On the afternoon of May 31, 1985, a violent and long-lived F5 tornado, the easternmost in United States history, struck parts of northeastern Ohio and northwestern Pennsylvania, including Newton Falls, Niles, and Coalburg in Ohio, and Wheatland in Pennsylvania. The tornado caused 310 injuries, 18 deaths, and $250 million of damages. The tornado was the strongest tornado of the 1985 United States–Canada tornado outbreak, being the only tornado to obtain F5 status and having maximum sustained winds of anywhere between 261 and 318 miles per hour (420 and 512 km/h).

The tornado touched down 8 miles (13 km) west of Newton Falls at approximately 6:30 pm on May 31, 1985. The F0 tornado tracked eastward, closing in on Newton Falls. Ten minutes later at 6:40 pm, the tornado struck Newton Falls at F3 intensity, where several buildings would be heavily damaged. The strengthening storm continued to track eastward. At 7:00 pm, the tornado struck Niles at F5 intensity. Several people were killed and dozen of buildings were damaged or destroyed in the town, including the Niles Park Plaza and a petroleum tank farm.

After devastating Niles, the storm shrunk as it passed over Coalburg. At approximately 7:15 pm, the tornado struck Wheatland at F5 intensity, 59 homes were damaged and over 100 buildings were leveled, killing six and injuring 32 other people. The tornado dissipated about 3 miles (4.8 km) SSW of Mercer, Pennsylvania at 7:30 pm. Overall, the F5 tornado lasted for approximately one hour.

== Meteorological synopsis ==
GOES 6 Satellite loop on May 31, showing a line of thunderstorms developing across Canada, Ohio, Pennsylvania and New York during the tornado outbreak

The upper air pattern was conducive for a major severe weather event in the Great Lakes that Friday, May 31. An unseasonably deep low-pressure system at 984 hPa crossed out of the Midwestern U.S. through the day, and then into the Upper Peninsula of Michigan. Very warm air surged in ahead of this system. Temperatures reached the upper twenties in Celsius (approximately 80–85 °F (27–29 °C)) across much of southern Ontario, in addition to high dew point levels. An unstable atmosphere (surface based lifted indices around minus 6) was the byproduct of this. Directional wind shear was also present in the warm sector of the storm, in addition to high helicity values and a vorticity maximum approaching the lower lakes.

The situation was worsened by the presence of copious amounts of moisture, which would allow any storms that could form to become severe rather quickly. Also, this was supportive of the HP (high-precipitation) counterpart of the supercell thunderstorm (Verkaik, 1997). All of this added up to the distinct possibility of severe rotating storms which would be messy, hard to see, and extremely dangerous. What was needed now was a trigger, and that came in the form of a trailing cold front behind the low. Severe thunderstorms and isolated tornadoes had already raked parts of the Midwestern United States (particularly in Iowa and Wisconsin) the day before on May 30, associated with this same cold front (Grazulis, 1990).

The day started off on an active note with the warm front moving northwards. A possible tornado was reported near Leamington, accompanied by golfball-size hail from widespread severe thunderstorm activity in southwestern Ontario. Following the warm frontal passage, skies cleared rapidly and temperatures quickly began to rise. The cold front began crossing Lake Huron towards the noon hour, and with it several thunderstorms developed shortly after 1:30pm EDT, with the northernmost cell soon becoming most dominant. Environment Canada issued a severe thunderstorm warning at 2:25pm for Bruce County (complementing the special weather statement issued early that morning). At around 2:50pm, an F2 tornado touched down briefly in the Lion's Head area (north of Wiarton) before moving out over Georgian Bay and dissipating.

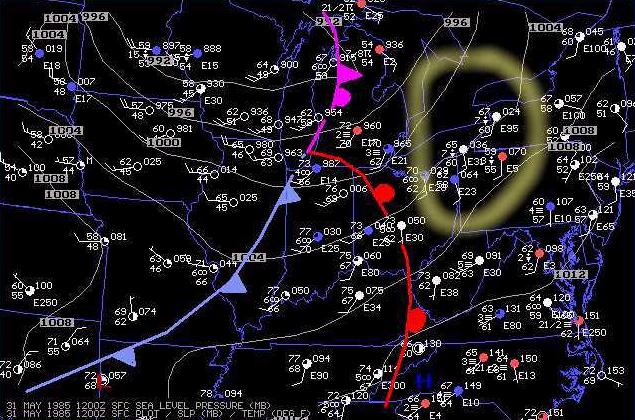
Surface map on the morning of May 31, 1985. Note the "triple-point" moving east toward southern Ontario

At daybreak on May 31, 1985, a strong area of low pressure was centered near Duluth, Minnesota. A cold front extended south from the low across the western Great Lakes and then through Illinois and Missouri. The low tracked across the northern Great Lakes during the afternoon, while the cold front progressed eastward across Indiana and western Ohio. By late afternoon, temperatures had reached 87 °F (31 °C) at Cleveland, 82 degrees at Youngstown, and 85 °F (29 °C) at Erie, Pennsylvania. At the same time, conditions in the upper atmosphere continued to become more favorable for an outbreak of severe weather. By early afternoon, thunderstorms developed in Ontario, Canada, just ahead of the cold front.

Despite a forecast for severe thunderstorms, though, the sun shone relentlessly for most of that Friday because of a fourth element: a stable air mass at about 2,000 feet above ground level, which served as a "lid" on the brew beneath. Then, at 2:50 p.m., the "lid" moved, and huge cumulonimbus clouds, anvil-topped thunderheads, appeared seemingly out of nowhere all along the Ohio-Pennsylvania border. The storms quickly grew into powerful tornadic supercells.

== Tornado summary ==
The tornado first touched down in Ohio near the Ravenna Arsenal in Portage County around 6:30 PM EDT. Gathering strength, it moved quickly into Newton Falls in Trumbull County causing F3 to F4 damage through much of the town. While nearly 400 homes were heavily damaged or destroyed, no fatalities were recorded in Newton Falls, due to the storm-readiness of local authorities and its tornado siren. Additional homes were completely destroyed as the tornado struck the north side of Lordstown. Continuing east, the tornado reached F5 intensity as it tore through the north side of Niles. Hundreds of homes in the Niles area were destroyed, including several homes with anchor bolts that were swept away with the debris scattered downwind. The Niles Park Plaza shopping center was completely leveled and partially swept away at F5 intensity, with several of the fatalities occurring at that location. Steel girders were buckled at the shopping center, and a nearby retirement home and a skating rink were leveled as well. As the tornado struck an industrial area in Niles, large 30 ft (9.1 m) tall metal petroleum storage tanks (each weighing 75,000 lb (34,000 kg)) were torn from where they were anchored and thrown, some of which were tossed or bounced considerable distances. One of the tanks was found in the middle of a road, 60 yd (55 m) from where it originated. The tornado weakened slightly as it tore through the north side of Hubbard and through the center of Coalburg, though many additional homes were still leveled in those areas.

As the tornado crossed the state line and reached Wheatland, Pennsylvania, it was a half-mile (0.8 km) wide and had regained F5 strength. A steel-frame trucking plant in Wheatland was obliterated and partially swept away at F5 intensity, as the building's steel girder frame was mangled into a pile and pushed off of the foundation. At nearby Wheatland Sheet and Tube, sections of pavement were scoured from the parking lot, and shards of sheet metal and routing slips were left wedged beneath the remaining asphalt. Ninety-five percent of Wheatland's business and residential area were destroyed. According to Storm Data from the National Weather Service, the destruction of the town "resembled that of a bombed-out battle field." Continuing east, the tornado weakened slightly but remained violent as it struck Hermitage, damaging or destroying 71 homes along with the town's airport, destroying several hangars and planes. A wing from one of the planes was found 10 mi (16 km) away in Mercer. Another trucking steel processing plant was heavily damaged in Hermitage as well. The tornado then destroyed 15 homes and damaged 30 others in the Greenfield area before finally dissipating.

In Ohio, it was the deadliest tornado since the Xenia F5 during the Super Outbreak of April 3, 1974. The tornado was also captured on camera by several residents.

== Impact ==
In Niles, the Niles Park Plaza was leveled and swept away, where most fatalities were reported. A roller-skating rink and a newly built nursing home were said to receive F5 damage. Across the street from the plaza there was a house with three elderly women–all of which were reported as dead. In the plaza's parking lot, there were flattened cars, referred to as 'pancakes', one of which was thrown over a mile (1.6 km). According to locals, at least 100 homes were destroyed and over 1,000 were damaged.

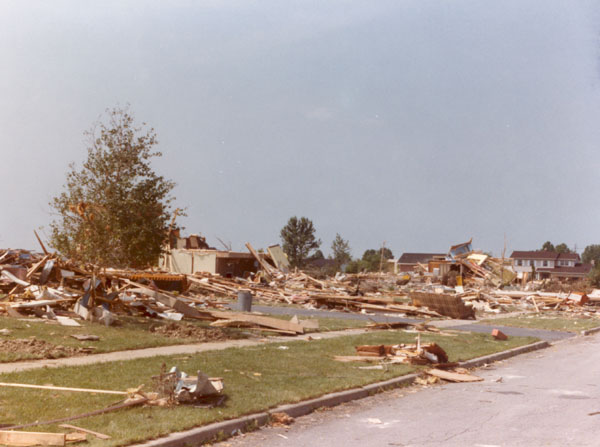
F3 damage as seen in Newton Falls after the tornado

It was reported that one woman had a splintered piece of telephone pole that impaled her to the ground. Another woman had her scalp torn off so deeply that it wasn't bleeding excessively. In Newton Falls, the tornado reportedly heavily damaged several homes at F3 intensity, some of which were frame homes. No fatalities happened in Newton Falls due to its tornado siren. At least 8 fatalities and 250 injuries were reported in Ohio.

In Wheatland, 99% of the town's industry was completely wiped out. The Wheatland Sheet and Tube factory was partially swept away and its steel girders 'twisted like a pretzel'. At least 50 homes were completely swept away and hundreds more damaged. Seven fatalities and 32 injuries were reported. In Hermitage, a trucking company and a maintenance garage containing 20 vehicles was completely leveled. Four planes were reported demolished at the Hermitage Airport. In total, 18 people were killed and 310 were injured throughout Ohio and Pennsylvania. The National Weather Service made a damage estimate of $250 million in nominal USD, equivalent to $753 million when adjusted for inflation. Damage in Wheatland was described as the following:

The destruction at Wheatland was so complete that most of the town resembled that of a bombed-out battle field.

=== Aftermath ===
The 1985 United States–Canada tornado outbreak had a total impact of 90 fatalities and 875 injuries. This made the outbreak the deadliest tornado outbreak worldwide since the 1974 Super Outbreak, and maintained its mark until the 2011 Super Outbreak; as well as being the third most eventful tornado outbreak in Canadian history in terms of total storms. The tornado remains the latest F5 tornado in Ohio and Pennsylvania, the only F5 tornado in the Northeastern United States, and the easternmost F5 tornado in the United States to-date.

== See also ==
- 1985 Barrie tornado – Another deadly tornado from the same outbreak
