= East Fallowfield Township, Pennsylvania =

East Fallowfield Township is the name of some places in the U.S. state of Pennsylvania:

- East Fallowfield Township, Chester County, Pennsylvania
- East Fallowfield Township, Crawford County, Pennsylvania

See also:

- Fallowfield Township, Pennsylvania
- West Fallowfield Township, Pennsylvania (disambiguation)
