= Bridge in East Fallowfield Township =

Bridge in East Fallowfield Township may refer to:

- Bridge in East Fallowfield Township (Atlantic, Pennsylvania), listed on the National Register of Historic Places in Crawford County, Pennsylvania
- Bridge in East Fallowfield Township (Mortonville, Pennsylvania), listed on the National Register of Historic Places in Chester County, Pennsylvania
