= 1985 Barrie tornado =

1985 F4 tornado in Ontario, Canada

- The rain-wrapped tornado as seen outside of Barrie.

Meteorological history
- Formed: May 31, 1985, 5:00 p.m. EDT (UTC−05:00)

F4 tornado
- on the Fujita scale
- Highest winds: 207–260 mph (333–418 km/h)

Overall effects
- Casualties: ≥ 8 fatalities, ≥ 155 injuries
- Damage: $150 million (1985 CAD) (Note: All losses are in 1985 CAD unless otherwise noted.) $391 million (2025 CAD)
- Part of the 1985 United States–Canada tornado outbreak and the tornadoes and tornado outbreaks of 1985

On Friday, May 31, 1985, a short-lived, but devastating and violent F4 tornado affected the City of Barrie, Ontario, Canada. The tornado was part of a larger outbreak that spanned both the preceding and the following day. The outbreak spawned several long-lived, cyclic, tornado-producing supercells over portions of Eastern Canada and the Great Lakes region of the Midwestern and Northeastern United States, one of which eventually generated the tornado.

== Meteorological synopsis ==
On the afternoon of May 31, atmospheric conditions were conducive to a large-scale severe weather event over portions of the Great Lakes region. An anomalously intense low-pressure system of no more than 984 mb (29.1 inHg) had already impinged on Michigan's Upper Peninsula. Meanwhile, a cold front had extended southward from the low across the western Great Lakes and then through Illinois and Missouri. Severe thunderstorms and isolated tornadoes had already impacted portions of the Midwest, particularly Iowa and Wisconsin, the day previous, associated with this same cold front. Very warm, moist air advected in ahead of this system, forming a broad warm sector. Temperatures reached approximately 80–85 °F (27–29 °C) across much of southern Ontario, in addition to high dew points. By late afternoon, temperatures had reached 87 °F (31 °C) at Cleveland, Ohio, 82 °F (28 °C) at Youngstown, and 85 °F (29 °C) at Erie, Pennsylvania.

== Tornado summary ==
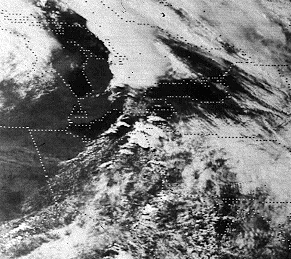
GOES visible satellite image showing overshooting tops as the tornado was entering Barrie

Over Ontario two very severe thunderstorms had developed (that probably owe their inception, at least partially, to lake-breeze-related convergence): one to the east of Clinton and another further to the north, in the Walkerton area. These would grow into a pair of devastating, cyclic storms within the next hour—likely the most prolific tornado producers in Canadian history to date. The Barrie tornado formed from the northernmost of this pair of supercells, was the final member of a long-lived tornado family, and may have consisted of three separate, short-tracked tornadoes. It formed in southern Simcoe County (Essa Township), less than 10 kilometres (6.2 mi) southwest of Highway 400 and the Barrie city limits. The situation was compounded by the presence of copious amounts of moisture, which would not only allow any storms that could form to become severe rather quickly, but also lead to the high-precipitation (HP) counterpart of the supercell thunderstorm, obscuring any tornado that could manage to develop.

Intensifying upon touchdown, the Barrie tornado first obliterated a pine tree forest plantation. Some 10-metre-tall (33 ft) trees were snapped at the 2-metre (6.6 ft) level. At this point the damage path was about 600 m (2,000 ft; 660 yd; 0.37 mi) wide, moving steadily towards the east-northeast. It then entered the southern part of Barrie shortly before 5:00 p.m. (21:00 UTC). Visibility was very low as the tornado was cloaked in heavy rain and dust, thus making it very difficult to see. Extensive F3 (although some localized F4) damage occurred to an entire square block of homes in the Crawford Street and Patterson Road subdivision. Five people were killed in the area as some homes there were not well-built, and thus collapsed after being pushed off their foundations. Two of these five deaths included a mother and son, killed when their Crawford Street home was completely levelled. Most of the fatalities occurred in homes with no basements, where head and chest trauma resulted from an increased exposure to flying debris.

Next, the tornado hit an industrial complex (known then as Molson Park). One person died at a tire retreading facility while at least 15 other businesses were damaged or destroyed. Steel I-beams were twisted violently out of shape, and splinters of wood were found embedded into nearby concrete walls. The tornado then proceeded to cross Highway 400 at Essa Road (former Highway 27) interchange, just missing the Barrie Racetrack to the south. The grandstand was heavily damaged and several barns nearby were destroyed. A man was killed after he was sucked out of his parked car in an adjacent lot. Several vehicles traveling on Highway 400 were tossed hundreds of metres into the ditch, the drivers escaping with only minor injuries. Highway guard rails were found wrapped around telephone poles nearby. Many cars were also found with puncture holes in their frames, owing to the flying debris. As it crossed the highway, it moved into the Allandale subdivision.

Many homes sustained severe damage there, with much of their upper floors missing. By this time the tornado's path had narrowed to about 300 metres (980 ft). The track moved from Debra Crescent to Joanne Court with more extensive damage. Near Tower Crescent, the path narrowed to a comparatively small fifty metres. On Briar Road, homes sustained only minor damage, indicating that the tornado had weakened somewhat. But the next road east, Trillium Crescent, sustained heavy damage indicating that it had strengthened once again. Four warehouses near Highway 11 were ripped apart. It then hit the Tollendal Woods and Minets Point area, taking out the Brentwood Marina and a nearby subdivision. A boy was killed in this area while trying to bicycle home. Over thirty boats, accompanied by their concrete moorings, were tossed into Lake Simcoe and never to be recovered. The tornado then moved out over Kempenfelt Bay where it became a waterspout for a brief time before weakening out completely. It came very close to the opposite shore, but no damage was reported there. Large quantities of debris from the city were later found floating in the bay, however. Despite the tornado's relatively short path length (under 10 kilometres (6.2 mi)), eight died in Barrie with 155 injured, and as many as 300 homes were damaged or destroyed. Unofficial estimates of the dead and injured ranged as high as 12 and 281, respectively.

== Aftermath ==
At approximately 4:00 p.m. EDT (20:00 UTC), all electrical power in Barrie went out, as the Grand Valley/Tottenham tornado took out the main hydroelectric power transformers, southwest of the city. Few residents had any idea of what was looming over the horizon, but many people were let off work 30–45 minutes before the storm hit due to these power outages. Had this not happened, the death toll would have undoubtedly been much higher. Hundreds of people were left out of work largely as a result of the massive damage sustained to the industrial complex in Barrie. Of the 605 homes in the path of the Barrie tornado, approximately one-third were rendered uninhabitable.

== See also ==
- 1985 Niles–Wheatland tornado – Another deadly tornado from the same outbreak
- 2014 Barrie tornado – High-end EF2 tornado affected southern Barrie as well as the nearby town of Angus
- 2007 Elie, Manitoba tornado – Only F5 tornado on record in Canada
- Edmonton tornado – Second deadliest Canadian tornado on record

== Sources ==
- Allen, D. E. (January 1986). Tornado Damage in the Barrie/Orangeville Area, Ontario, May 1985 (PDF). National Research Council Canada (Technical report). Building Research Note. Ottawa: National Research Council Canada: Institute for Research in Construction. 240. Archived from the original (PDF) on 2 April 2012.
- Brooks, Harold E. (April 2004). "On the Relationship of Tornado Path Length and Width to Intensity". Weather and Forecasting. 19 (2). American Meteorological Society: 310–19. Bibcode:2004WtFor..19..310B. doi:10.1175/1520-0434(2004)019<0310:OTROTP>2.0.CO;2.
- Cook, A. R.; Schaefer, J. T. (August 2008). "The Relation of El Niño–Southern Oscillation (ENSO) to Winter Tornado Outbreaks". Monthly Weather Review. 136 (8). American Meteorological Society: 3135. Bibcode:2008MWRv..136.3121C. doi:10.1175/2007MWR2171.1.
- Environment and Climate Change Canada (May 1985). Verified Tornadoes (Report). Government of Canada – via Canadian National Tornado Database.
- Etkin, David A.; Brun, Soren E.; Chrom, Solomon; Dogra, Pooja (July 2002). A Tornado Scenario for Barrie, Ontario (PDF). Institute for Catastrophic Loss Reduction (Technical report). Canadian Natural Hazards Assessment Project. Toronto: Adaptation and Impacts Research Group, Environment Canada; University of Toronto. 20.
- Fujita, Ted; Stiegler, Duane J., eds. (May 1985). "Tornado Outbreak in the United States and Canada on May 31, 1985". Outstanding Storms of the Month. Storm Data. 27 (5). Asheville, North Carolina: National Climatic Data Center.
- Fuller, John G. (1987). Tornado Watch Number 211. William Morrow and Company. ISBN 978-0688065904.
- Grazulis, Thomas P. (November 1990). Significant Tornadoes 1880–1989. Vol. 2. St. Johnsbury, Vermont: The Tornado Project of Environmental Films. ISBN 1-879362-02-3.
- Grazulis, Thomas P. (July 1993). Significant Tornadoes 1680–1991: A Chronology and Analysis of Events. St. Johnsbury, Vermont: The Tornado Project of Environmental Films. ISBN 1-879362-03-1.
- Grazulis, Thomas P. (2001a). The Tornado: Nature's Ultimate Windstorm. Norman, Oklahoma: University of Oklahoma Press. ISBN 978-0-8061-3538-0.
- Grazulis, Thomas P. (2001b). F5-F6 Tornadoes. St. Johnsbury, Vermont: The Tornado Project of Environmental Films.
- Séguin, Jacinthe, ed. (2008). "Vulnerabilities to Natural Hazards and Extreme Weather" (PDF). Human Health in a Changing Climate: a Canadian Assessment of Vulnerabilities and Adaptive Capacity (PDF). Ottawa: Health Canada.
- Joe, P.; Leduc, M. (1993). "Radar Signatures and Severe Weather Forecasting". In Burgess, D.; Church, C.; Davies-Jones, R.; Doswell, C. (eds.). The Tornado: Its Structure, Dynamics, Prediction, and Hazards. Washington, D.C.: American Geophysical Union. pp. 233–240.
- LeGrand, Jacques (1990). Abbott, Elizabeth (ed.). Chronicle of Canada. Montreal: Chronicle Publications. ISBN 9780920417164.
- National Weather Service (May 1985). "Storm Data and Unusual Weather Phenomena". Storm Data. 27 (5). Asheville, North Carolina: National Climatic Data Center.
- National Weather Service (June 1985). "Storm Data and Unusual Weather Phenomena". Storm Data. 27 (6). Asheville, North Carolina: National Climatic Data Center.
- National Weather Service (May–June 1985). Storm Data Publication (Report). National Centers for Environmental Information – via Storm Events Database.
- Neal, Lott; McCown, Sam; Ross, Tom (August 2000) [1999]. 1998-1999 Tornadoes and a Long-Term U.S. Tornado Climatology (PDF) (Technical report). National Climatic Data Center Technical Report. Asheville, North Carolina: National Climatic Data Center. 99-02.
- Verkaik, Jerrine; Verkaik, Arjen (1997). Under the Whirlwind (1st ed.). Elmwood, Frontenac County, Ontario: Whirlwind Books. ISBN 9780968153703.
- Witten, Donald E. (August 1985). "May 31, 1985: a Deadly Tornado Outbreak" (PDF). Weatherwise. Vol. 38, no. 4. Washington, D.C.: Heldref Publications.
