= Coalburg =

Coalburg may refer to the following unincorporated communities in the United States:

- Coalburg, Alabama
- Coalburg, West Virginia
- Coalburg, Ohio

== See also ==
- Passaic Junction (rail yard), a rail yard known in the 19th century as Coalburg Junction
