= Canal Township, Pennsylvania =

Township in Pennsylvania, US

Coordinates: 41°29′00″N 79°56′59″W

- Township
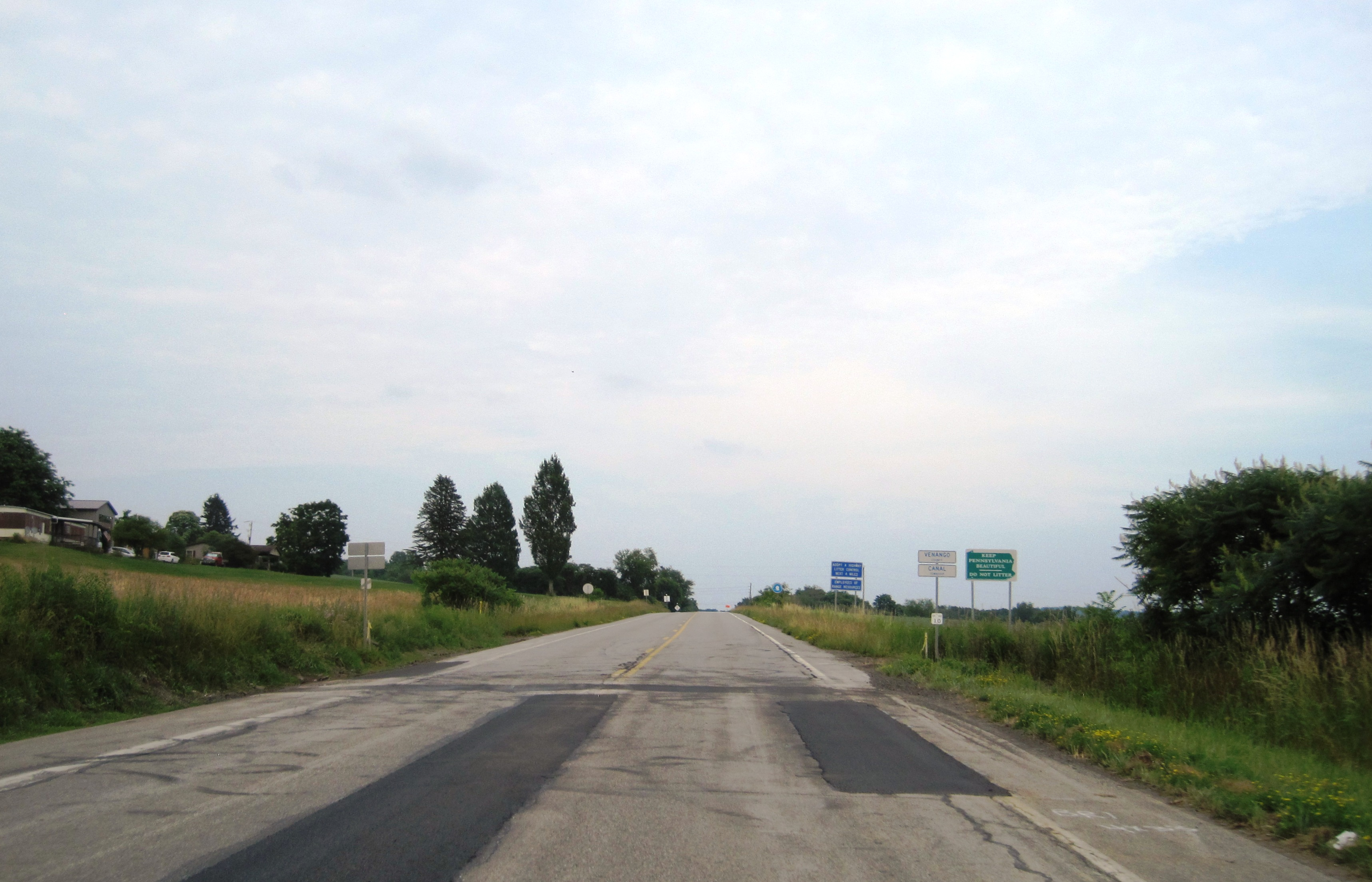
- Entering Canal Township along eastbound US 322

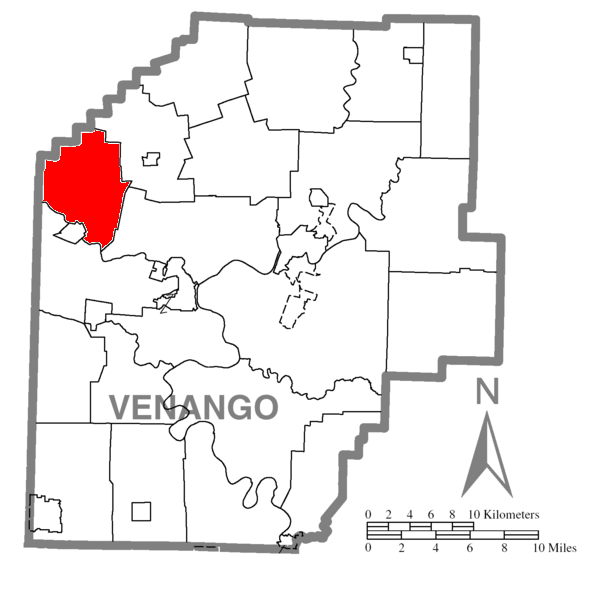
- Map of Venango County, Pennsylvania highlighting Canal Township

- Map of Venango County, Pennsylvania
- Country: United States
- State: Pennsylvania
- County: Venango
- Settled: 1797
- Incorporated: 1833

Government
  - Type: Board of Supervisors

Area
  - Total: 24.43 sq mi (63.28 km^{2})
  - Land: 24.31 sq mi (62.97 km^{2})
  - Water: 0.12 sq mi (0.31 km^{2})

Population (2020)
  - Total: 934 ▼
  - Estimate (2024): 906
  - Density: 39.5/sq mi (15.25/km^{2})
- Time zone: UTC-5 (Eastern (EST))
  - Summer (DST): UTC-4 (EDT)
- Area code: 814
- FIPS code: 42-121-11080

Canal Township is a township in Venango County, Pennsylvania, United States. The population was 934 at the 2020 census, a decrease from 1,203 in 2010, which was, in turn, an increase over the figure of 1,008 tabulated as of the 2000 census.

== Geography ==
According to the United States Census Bureau, the township has a total area of 24.7 square miles (64 km^{2}), of which 24.5 square miles (63 km^{2}) is land and 0.1 square miles (0.26 km^{2}) (0.49%) is water. It contains the census-designated place of Hannasville.

== Demographics ==
Historical population
Census	Pop.	Note	%±
2000	1.008		—
2010	1,023		101,388.1%
2020	934		−8.7%
2024 (est.)	906		−3.0%
U.S. Decennial Census

As of the census of 2000, there were 1,008 people, 382 households, and 301 families residing in the township. The population density was 41.1 inhabitants per square mile (15.9/km^{2}). There were 432 housing units at an average density of 17.6/sq mi (6.8/km^{2}). The racial makeup of the township was 99.50% White, 0.10% African American, 0.10% Native American, 0.10% from other races, and 0.20% from two or more races. Hispanic or Latino of any race were 0.40% of the population.

There were 382 households, out of which 33.0% had children under the age of 18 living with them, 68.6% were married couples living together, 5.2% had a female householder with no husband present, and 21.2% were non-families. 16.8% of all households were made up of individuals, and 6.8% had someone living alone who was 65 years of age or older. The average household size was 2.64 and the average family size was 2.94.

In the township the population was spread out, with 24.0% under the age of 18, 7.1% from 18 to 24, 28.7% from 25 to 44, 27.6% from 45 to 64, and 12.6% who were 65 years of age or older. The median age was 40 years. For every 100 females, there were 104.0 males. For every 100 females age 18 and over, there were 101.6 males.

The median income for a household in the township was $36,484, and the median income for a family was $42,833. Males had a median income of $30,463 versus $22,109 for females. The per capita income for the township was $16,612. About 4.7% of families and 6.2% of the population were below the poverty line, including 8.1% of those under age 18 and 3.9% of those age 65 or over.
