= Tornadoes of 1985 =

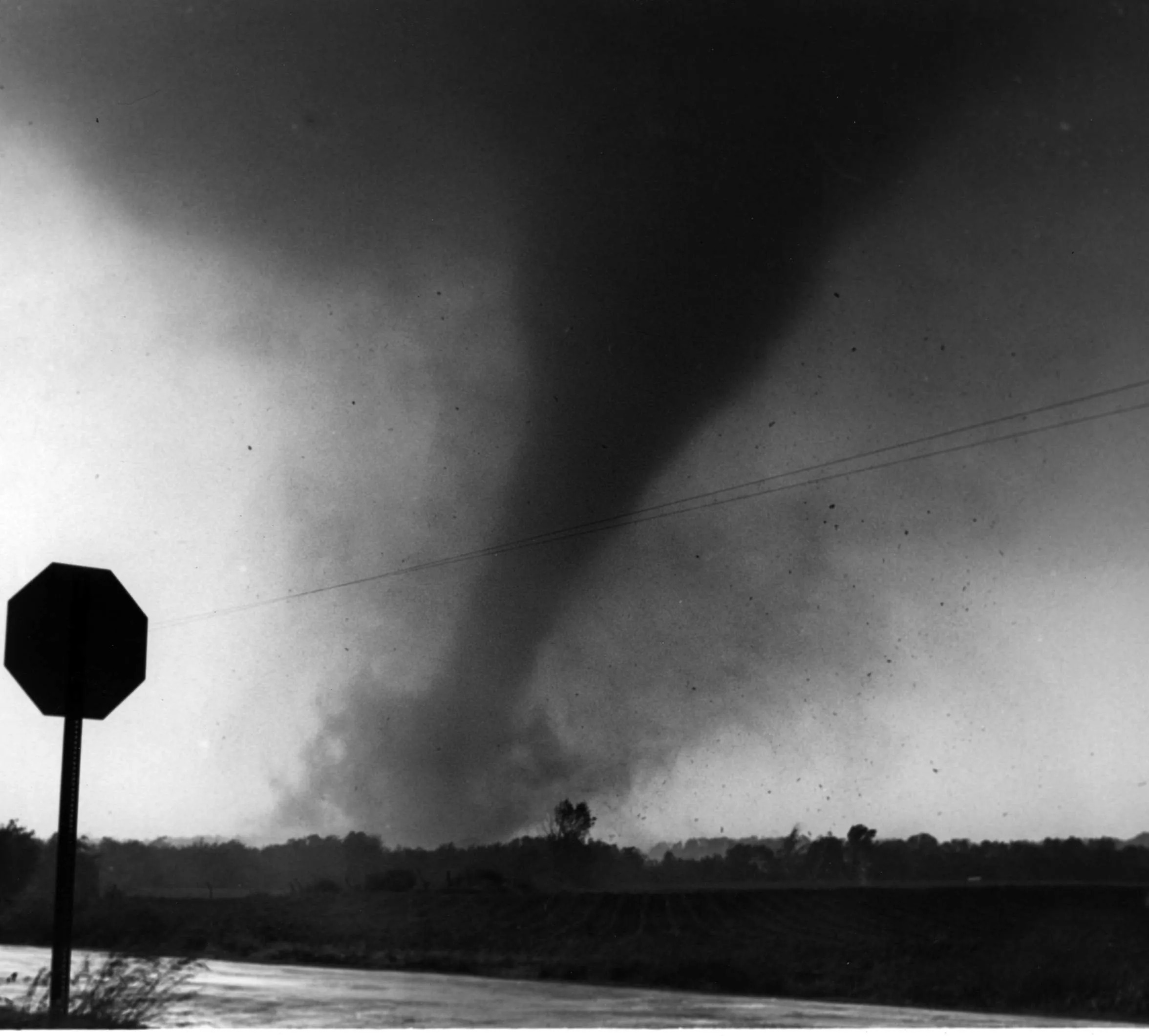
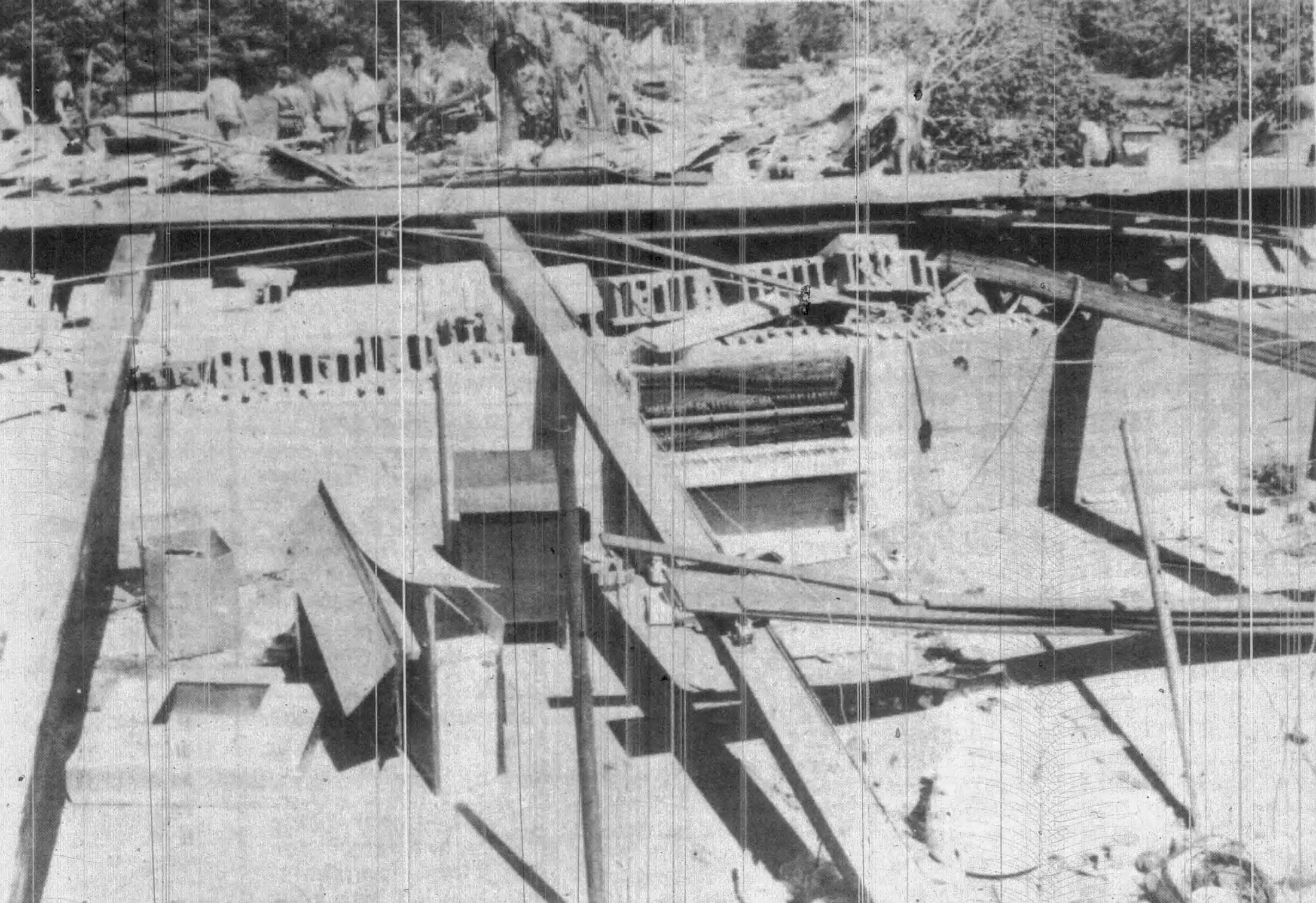
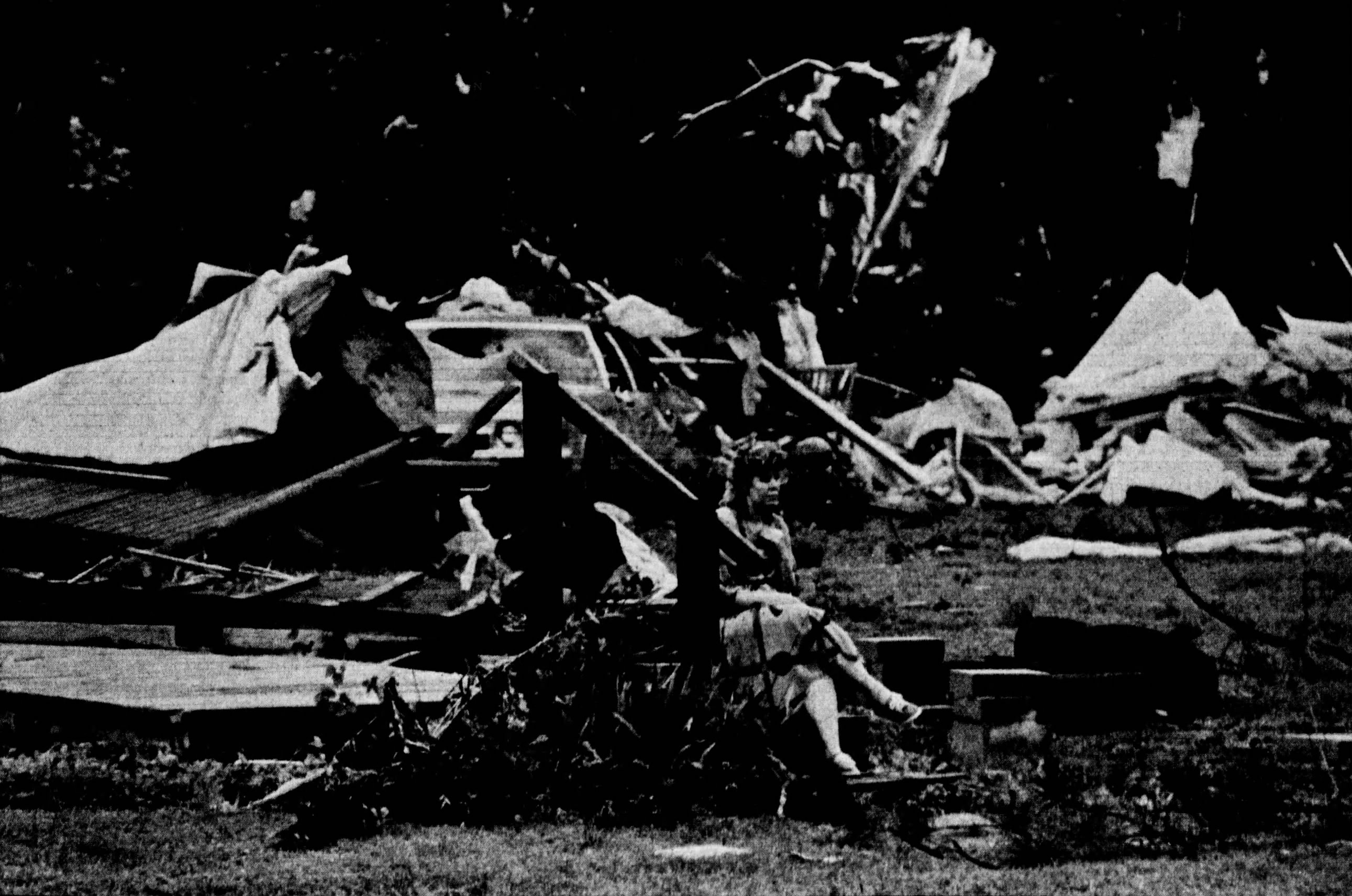
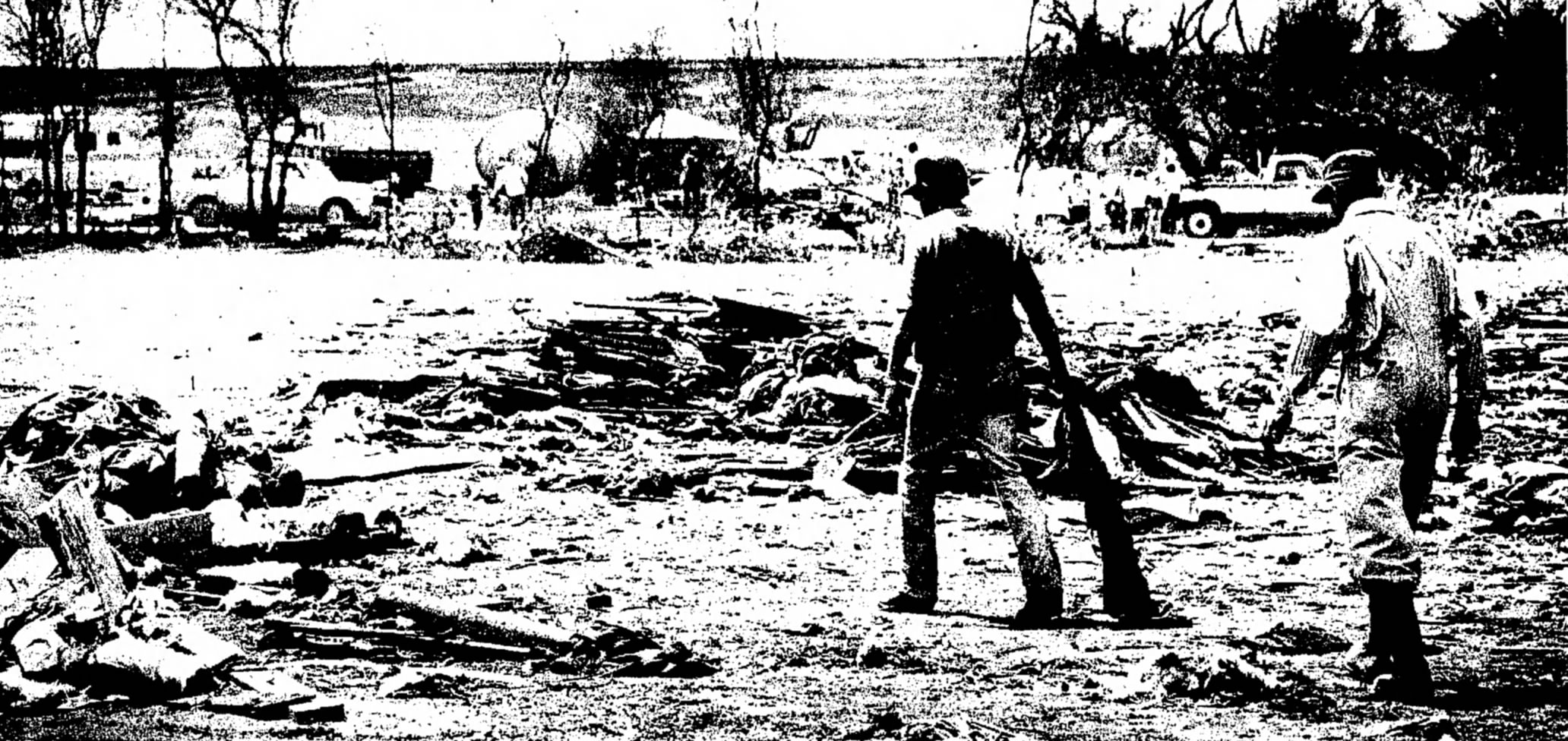
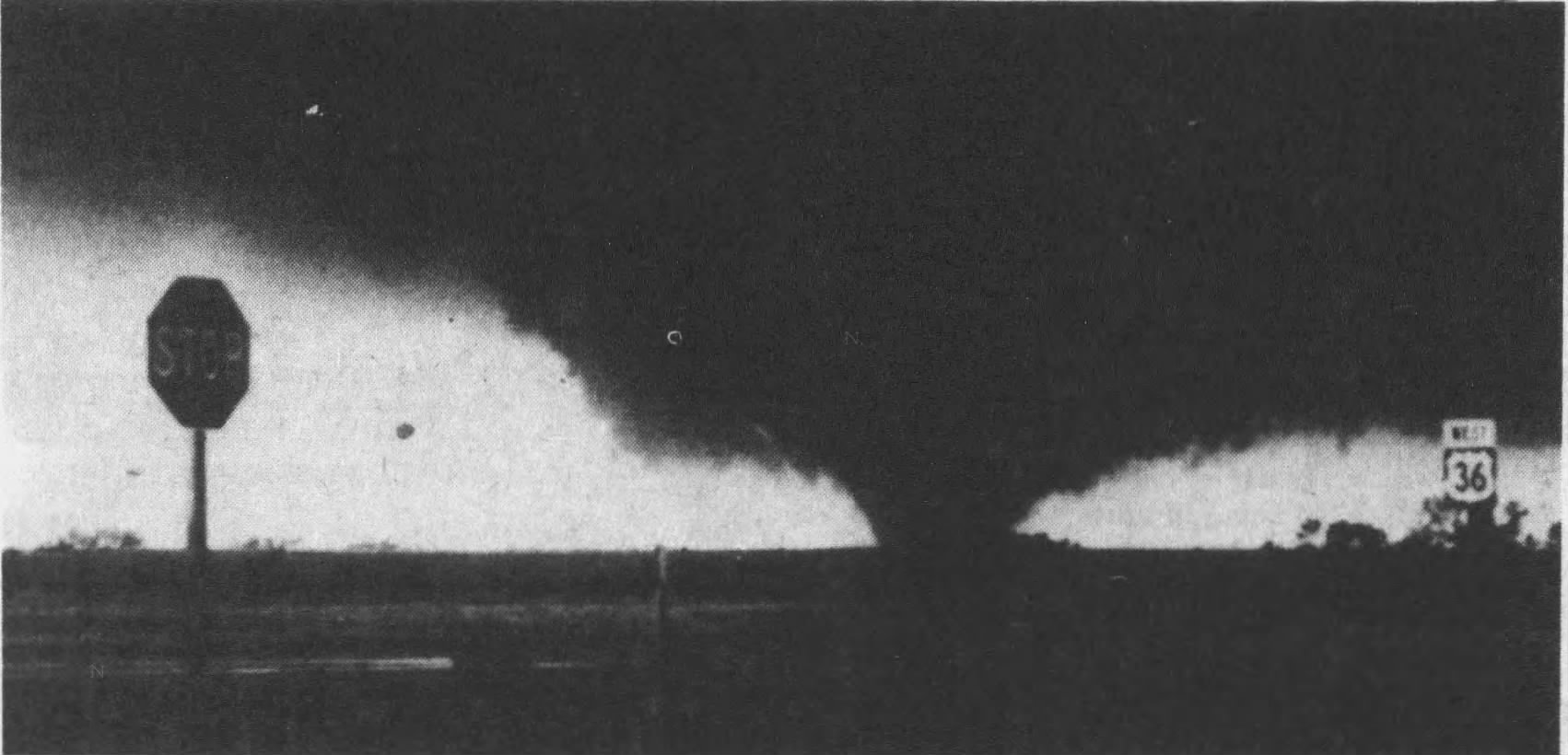
- Clockwise from top: A large F3 tornado near Utica, Ohio on May 31; A piano left upright in the ruins of a home in Park Falls, Wisconsin after an F3 tornado on June 8; A home near Phillipsburg, Kansas after an F4 tornado on May 10; A large F4 tornado approaching Agra, Kansas on May 10; The ruins of a home in Parrish, Alabama after an F2 tornado on August 16; A satellite loop showing a time-lapse of a major tornado outbreak on May 31.
- Timespan: January–December 1985
- Maximum rated tornado: F5 tornado: Niles, Ohio–Wheatland, Pennsylvania on May 31
- Tornadoes in U.S.: 686
- Damage (U.S.): unknown
- Fatalities (U.S.): 94
- Fatalities (worldwide): >108

This page documents the tornadoes and tornado outbreaks of 1985, primarily in the United States. Most tornadoes form in the U.S., although some events may take place internationally. Tornado statistics for older years like this often appear significantly lower than modern years due to fewer reports or confirmed tornadoes.

== Synopsis ==
Fatal United States tornadoes in 1985
- Approximate touchdown location of killer tornadoes in 1985 Summary of tornadoes: March 17 – Florida (2 deaths); April 5 – Illinois (1 death); April 21 – Texas (3 deaths); April 28 – Texas (1 death); May 30 – Iowa, Wisconsin (2 deaths); May 31 – Ohio, Pennsylvania (12 deaths); May 31 – Pennsylvania (1 death); May 31 – Pennsylvania, Ohio (16 deaths); May 31 – Pennsylvania (2 deaths); May 31 – Ohio, Pennsylvania (18 deaths); May 31 – Pennsylvania (7 deaths); May 31 – Ohio (1 death); May 31 – Pennsylvania (4 deaths); May 31 – Pennsylvania (9 deaths); May 31 – Pennsylvania (6 deaths); June 8 – Wisconsin (2 deaths); June 8 – Michigan (1 death); August 12 – Wisconsin (2 deaths); August 16 – Alabama (1 death); November 18 – Arkansas (3 deaths); Total fatalities: 94

The tornado season of 1985 saw very little action in the winter months, and even the spring wasn't particularly notable until the massive May 31 outbreak, one of the most intense and deadliest in modern American history, which saw 44 tornadoes kill 88 people in Ohio, Pennsylvania, New York and Ontario, Canada. Eight of 1985's ten F4 tornadoes and the one F5 tornado happened during this outbreak.

== Events ==
Confirmed tornado total for the entire year 1985 in the United States.

Confirmed tornadoes by Fujita rating
FU	F0	F1	F2	F3	F4	F5	Total
0	308	259	79	29	10	1	686

== January ==
There were 2 tornadoes confirmed in the US in January.

== February ==
There were 7 tornadoes confirmed in the US in February.

== March ==
There were 38 tornadoes confirmed in the US in March.

=== March 11 ===
An F2 tornado hit Hollister, California causing no injuries.

=== March 17 ===
An F3 tornado killed two in Sarasota County, Florida.

== April ==
There were 134 tornadoes confirmed in the US in April.

=== April 21–23 ===
An F3 tornado in Texas resulted in three fatalities. Another notable storm from this event includes an F3 tornado that started about 4 miles northeast of Ida, Louisiana, moving into Arkansas, where it mainly dealt F1 damage in wooded areas. The tornadoes were part of a large outbreak that spawned over 30 tornadoes.

=== April 29 ===
A low-end F2 tornado touched down in the Ardmore, Oklahoma area. This tornado is notable due to the TOtable Tornado Observatory getting its closest to a tornado, being sideswiped by the edge of the storm. This storm brought the realization that TOTO had a center of gravity too high for extreme wind, resulting in it falling down when it got sideswiped.

== May ==
There were 182 tornadoes confirmed in the US in May.

=== May 10 ===
FU	F0	F1	F2	F3	F4	F5
0	1	3	1	3	2	0

An outbreak of tornadoes occurred in Kansas and Nebraska. One of the notable F4 tornadoes was the Agra Tornado, touched down in Phillips County, Kansas, near the city of Agra. The tornado then crossed into Nebraska travelling through Franklin, and Webster Counties. The tornado varied in width throughout its life, ranging from 200-1000 yards, Agra resident Bob Scales took images for of the tornado over a 20 minute period, showing the tornado go from a large wedge, to a stovepipe tornado.

=== May 31 ===
FU	F0	F1	F2	F3	F4	F5
0	4	12	7	12	8	1

A major tornado outbreak occurred in Ohio, Pennsylvania, New York, and Ontario on the last day of May. 44 tornadoes were confirmed, including 14 in Ontario. It is the largest and most intense tornado outbreak ever to hit this region. 90 people were killed and nine tornadoes were F4 or stronger, including the F5 Niles-Wheatland tornado.

Areas with the most devastation and deaths were Wheatland, Atlantic, and Albion, Pennsylvania. Yourga Trucking in Wheatland was hit beyond recognition in addition to the Amish community in Atlantic. Wheatland had 310 injuries and 18 fatalities while Atlantic had 125 and 16.

== June ==
There were 82 tornadoes confirmed in the US in June.

=== June 8 ===
Tornadoes killed two in Wisconsin and one in Michigan.

=== June 29 (Indonesia) ===
An unrated but damaging tornado struck Musi Bayuasin Regency in the south part of Sumatra. The tornado damaged/destroyed schools, mosques and two hundreds of homes in the village. Fortunately no casualties were reported.

== July ==
There were 51 tornadoes confirmed in the US in July.

=== July 25 ===
An F3 tornado spawned by Hurricane Bob briefly touched down near the Albemarle County and Greene County line, hitting a grocery store and a subdivision, causing no deaths or injuries.

== August ==
There were 108 tornadoes confirmed in the US in August.

=== August 12 ===
An F2 tornado struck Auburndale, WI, which caused millions of dollars in damage and completely destroyed a mobile home.

=== August 16 ===
An F3 tornado spawned by Hurricane Danny struck Waco, Tennessee, and produced a damage swath that was 500 yards wide.

== September ==
There were 40 tornadoes confirmed in the US in September.

=== September 3 (Philippines) ===
An EF1 tornado spawned by Typhoon Tess struck Lemery, Batangas where it destroyed 56 houses and left 336 people homeless. It killed a 5-year-old boy and injured 5 other people.

== October ==
There were 18 tornadoes confirmed in the US in October.

== November ==
There were 19 tornadoes confirmed in the US in November.

=== November 18 ===
An F3 tornado killed three in Arkansas.

== December ==
There were 3 tornadoes confirmed in the US in December.

== See also ==
- Tornado
  - Tornadoes by year
  - Tornado records
  - Tornado climatology
  - Tornado myths
- List of tornado outbreaks
  - List of F5 and EF5 tornadoes
  - List of North American tornadoes and tornado outbreaks
  - List of 21st-century Canadian tornadoes and tornado outbreaks
  - List of European tornadoes and tornado outbreaks
  - List of tornadoes and tornado outbreaks in Asia
  - List of Southern Hemisphere tornadoes and tornado outbreaks
  - List of tornadoes striking downtown areas
- Tornado intensity
  - Fujita scale
  - Enhanced Fujita scale
