= Hannasville, Pennsylvania =

Unincorporated community in Pennsylvania, US

Coordinates: 41°28′40″N 79°56′52″W

- Census-designated place
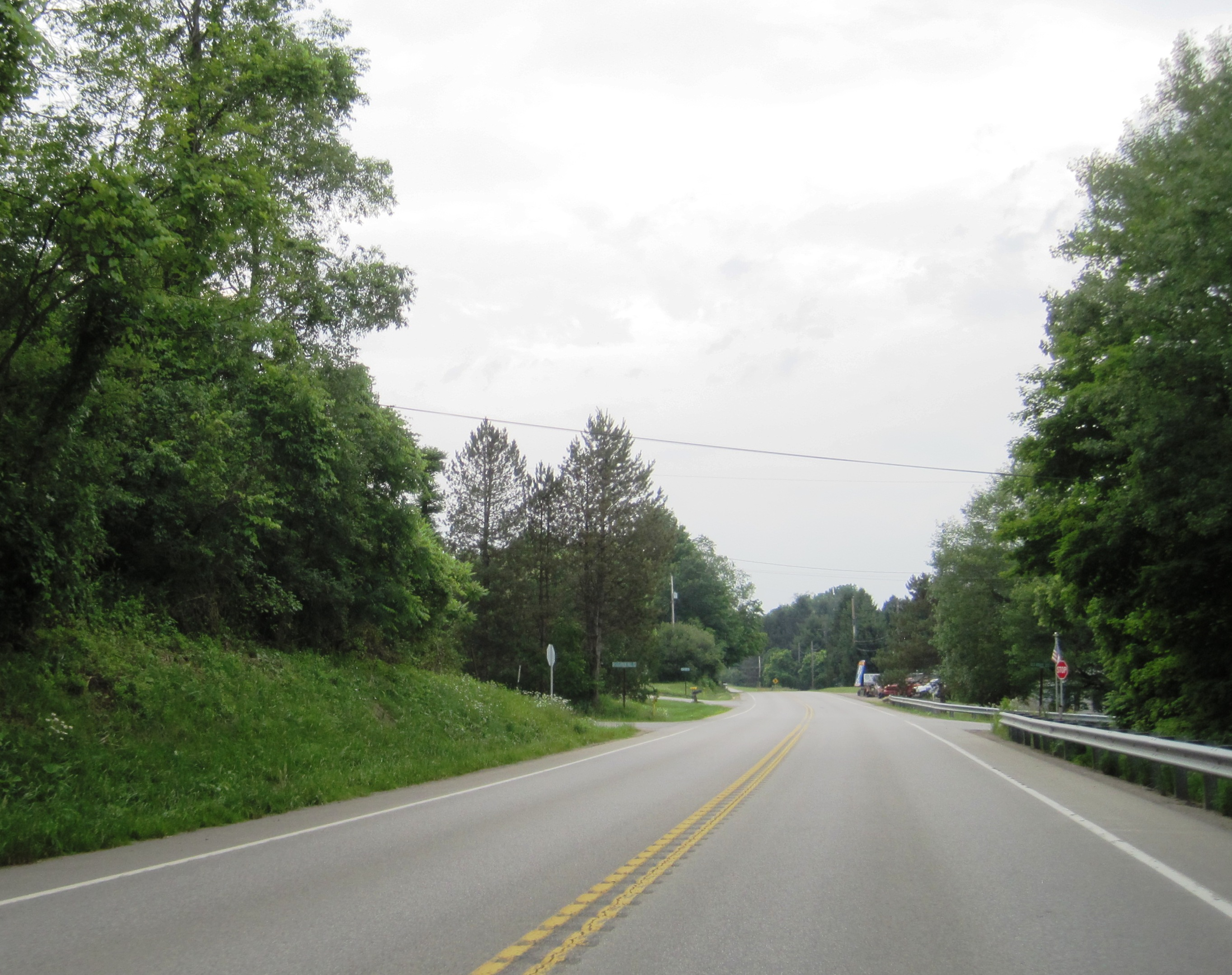
- Westbound US 322 in Hannasville
- Interactive map of Hannasville, Pennsylvania
- Country: United States
- State: Pennsylvania
- County: Venango

Area
  - Total: 1.51 sq mi (3.92 km^{2})
  - Land: 1.51 sq mi (3.92 km^{2})
  - Water: 0 sq mi (0.00 km^{2})

Population (2020)
  - Total: 159
  - Density: 104.9/sq mi (40.52/km^{2})
- Time zone: UTC-5 (Eastern (EST))
  - Summer (DST): UTC-4 (EDT)
- FIPS code: 42-32384

Hannasville is a census-designated place located in Canal Township, Venango County, in the state of Pennsylvania. The community is located along U.S. Route 322. As of the 2010 census the population was 176.

== Demographics ==
Historical population
Census	Pop.	Note	%±
2020	159		—
U.S. Decennial Census
