= Bridge in East Fallowfield Township (Atlantic, Pennsylvania) =

- U.S. National Register of Historic Places
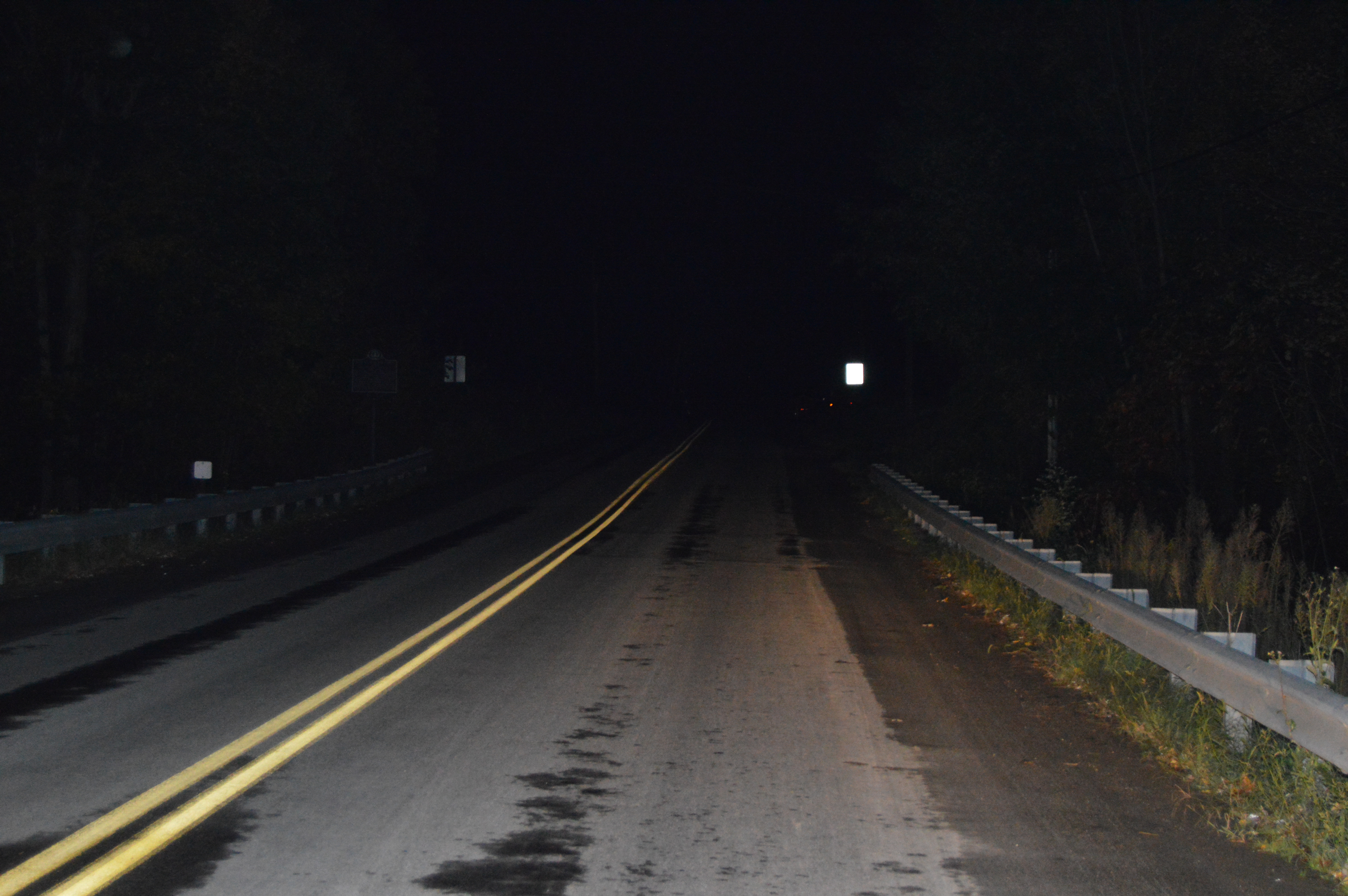
- Concrete girder bridge that has replaced the historic truss bridge

- Location within Pennsylvania Location within the United States
- Location: Legislative Route 20012 over Unger Run, Atlantic, Pennsylvania
- Coordinates: 41°32′6″N 80°20′14″W
- Area: less than one acre
- Built: 1894
- Built by: Wrought Iron Bridge Co.
- Architectural style: Pratt through truss
- MPS: Highway Bridges Owned by the Commonwealth of Pennsylvania, Department of Transportation TR
- NRHP reference No.: 88000825
- Added to NRHP: June 22, 1988

Bridge in East Fallowfield Township is a historic metal truss bridge spanning Unger Run at Atlantic, Crawford County, Pennsylvania. It was built in 1894 by the Wrought Iron Bridge Company. It is a multiple span, metal truss bridge.

It was added to the National Register of Historic Places in 1988.
