= East Fallowfield Township, Crawford County, Pennsylvania =

Township in Pennsylvania, US

Coordinates: 41°32′00″N 80°19′59″W

- Township
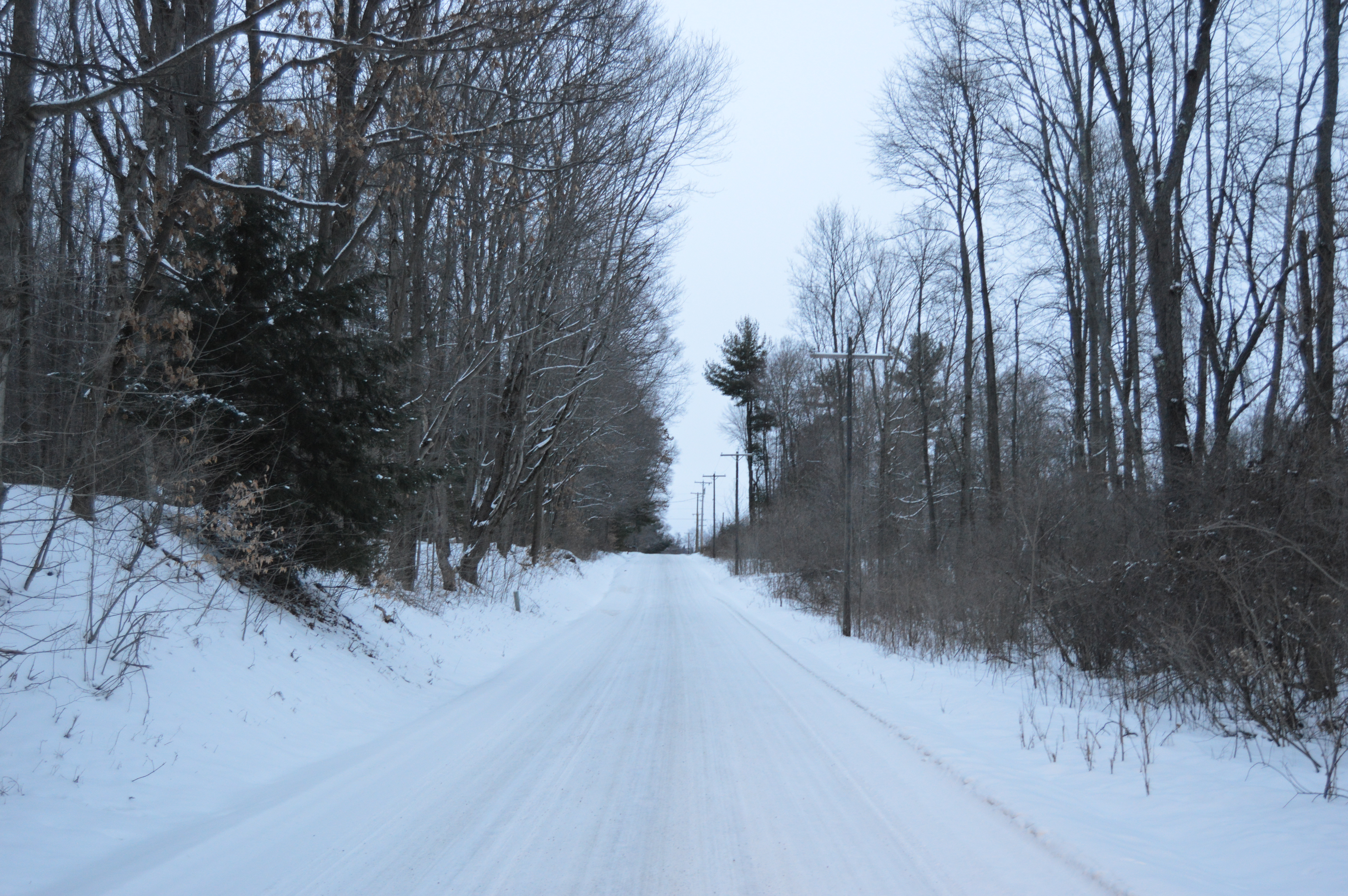
- Snowy road through woodlands east of Hartstown

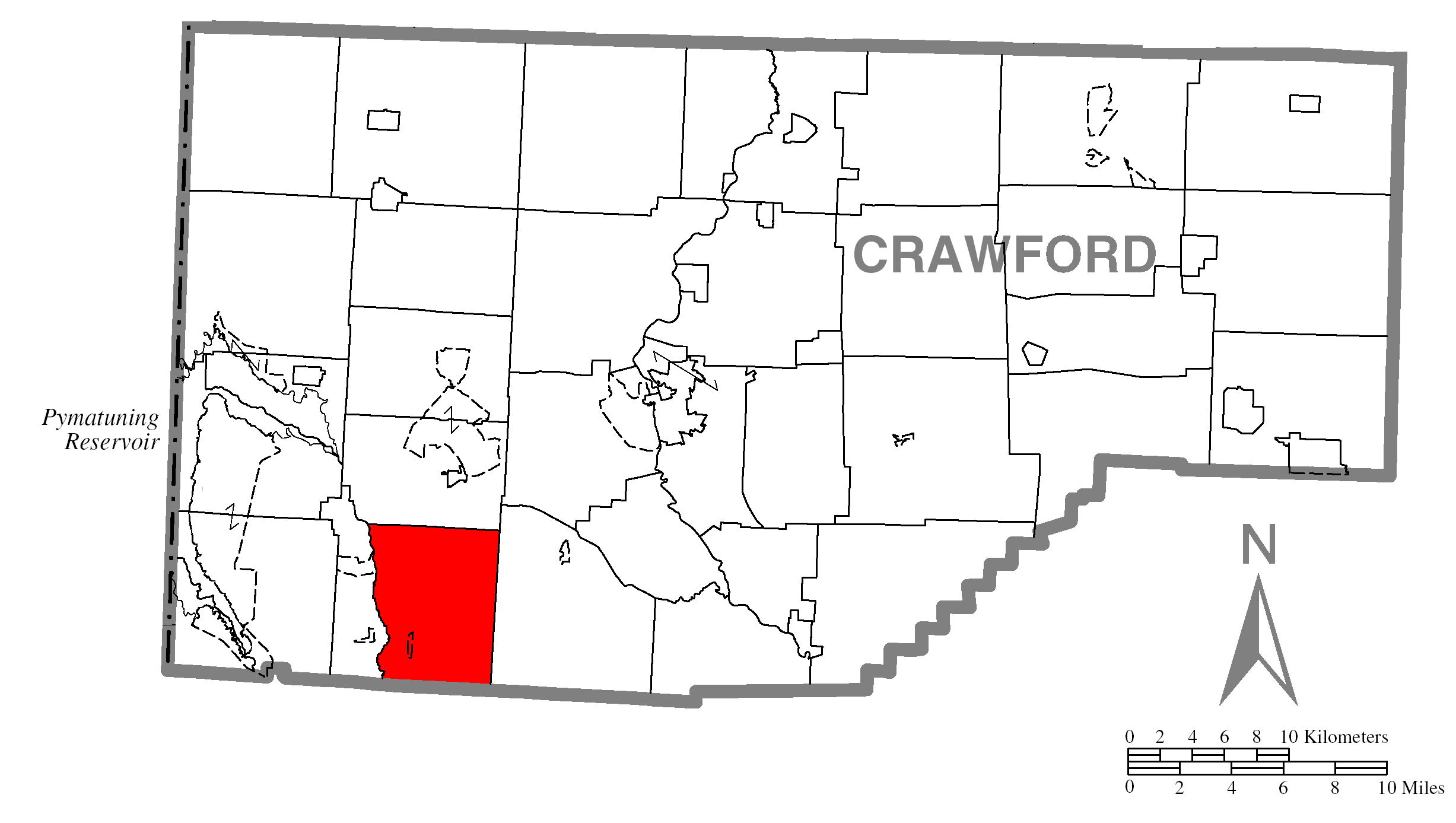
- Location of East Fallowfield Township in Crawford County

- Location of Crawford County in Pennsylvania
- Country: United States
- State: Pennsylvania
- County: Crawford

Area
  - Total: 28.09 sq mi (72.76 km^{2})
  - Land: 28.05 sq mi (72.66 km^{2})
  - Water: 0.039 sq mi (0.10 km^{2})
- Highest elevation (high point north of Jackson Run): 1,390 ft (420 m)
- Lowest elevation (Crooked Creek in Pymatuning Swamp): 1,020 ft (310 m)

Population (2020)
  - Total: 1,515 ▼
  - Estimate (2024): 1,526
  - Density: 56.6/sq mi (21.87/km^{2})
- Time zone: UTC-4 (EST)
  - Summer (DST): UTC-5 (EDT)
- Area code: 814
- FIPS code: 42-039-21112

East Fallowfield Township is a township in Crawford County, Pennsylvania, United States. The population was 1,515 at the 2020 census, down from 1,620 in 2010.

== History ==
East Fallowfield is said to be named for Lancelot Fallowfield, one of the first purchasers of land from William Penn.

== Geography ==
The township is in southwestern Crawford County and is bordered to the south by Mercer County. It contains the unincorporated community of Atlantic.

According to the United States Census Bureau, the township has a total area of 28.1 square miles (72.8 km^{2}), of which 28.1 square miles (72.7 km^{2}) is land and 0.04 square miles (0.1 km^{2}), or 0.14%, is water.

=== Natural features ===
Geologic Province: Northwestern Glaciated Plateau
Lowest Elevation: 1,020 ft (310 m) Crooked Creek at Pymatuning Marsh.
Highest Elevation: 1,390 ft (420 m) at a high point north of Jackson Run.
Major Rivers/Streams and Watersheds: Crooked Creek (forms western boundary of township), Conneaut Outlet, and Sandy Creek
Minor Rivers/Streams and Watersheds:

- Crooked Creek tributaries (western township): McDowell Run, Randolph Run and its tributary, Jackson Run
- Conneaut Outlet tributaries (northeastern township): Adsit Run

Lakes and Waterbodies: Dollar Lake and Lower Lake (both impoundments)
Biological Diversity Areas: McMillen Hollow BDA, Pymatuning Wetland Complex-Central BDA, Pymatuning Wetland Complex-South BDA
Landscape Conservation Area: Conneaut Marsh-Geneva Marsh LCA
Important Bird Areas: Conneaut Marsh-Geneva Marsh and Pymatuning-Hartstown
Important Mammal Areas: Pymatuning Wildlife Management Area and State Game Lands #214

== Demographics ==
Historical population
Census	Pop.	Note	%±
2000	1,434		—
2010	1,620		13.0%
2020	1,515		−6.5%
2024 (est.)	1,526		0.7%
U.S. Decennial Census

As of the census of 2000, there were 1,434 people, 436 households, and 365 families residing in the township. The population density was 51.1 inhabitants per square mile (19.7/km^{2}). There were 467 housing units at an average density of 16.7/sq mi (6.4/km^{2}). The racial makeup of the township was 97.28% White, 0.98% African American, 0.77% Native American, 0.07% Asian, 0.07% from other races, and 0.84% from two or more races. Hispanic or Latino of any race were 0.91% of the population.

There were 436 households, out of which 44.5% had children under the age of 18 living with them, 70.4% were married couples living together, 7.8% had a female householder with no husband present, and 16.1% were non-families. 13.5% of all households were made up of individuals, and 6.7% had someone living alone who was 65 years of age or older. The average household size was 3.29 and the average family size was 3.63.

In the township the population was spread out, with 37.7% under the age of 18, 7.3% from 18 to 24, 27.5% from 25 to 44, 18.7% from 45 to 64, and 8.8% who were 65 years of age or older. The median age was 29 years. For every 100 females there were 108.7 males. For every 100 females age 18 and over, there were 99.1 males.

The median income for a household in the township was $31,957, and the median income for a family was $33,313. Males had a median income of $29,850 versus $16,833 for females. The per capita income for the township was $11,233. About 15.0% of families and 23.1% of the population were below the poverty line, including 37.8% of those under age 18 and 7.4% of those age 65 or over.
