= Atlantic, Pennsylvania =

Unincorporated community in Pennsylvania, US

- Census-designated place
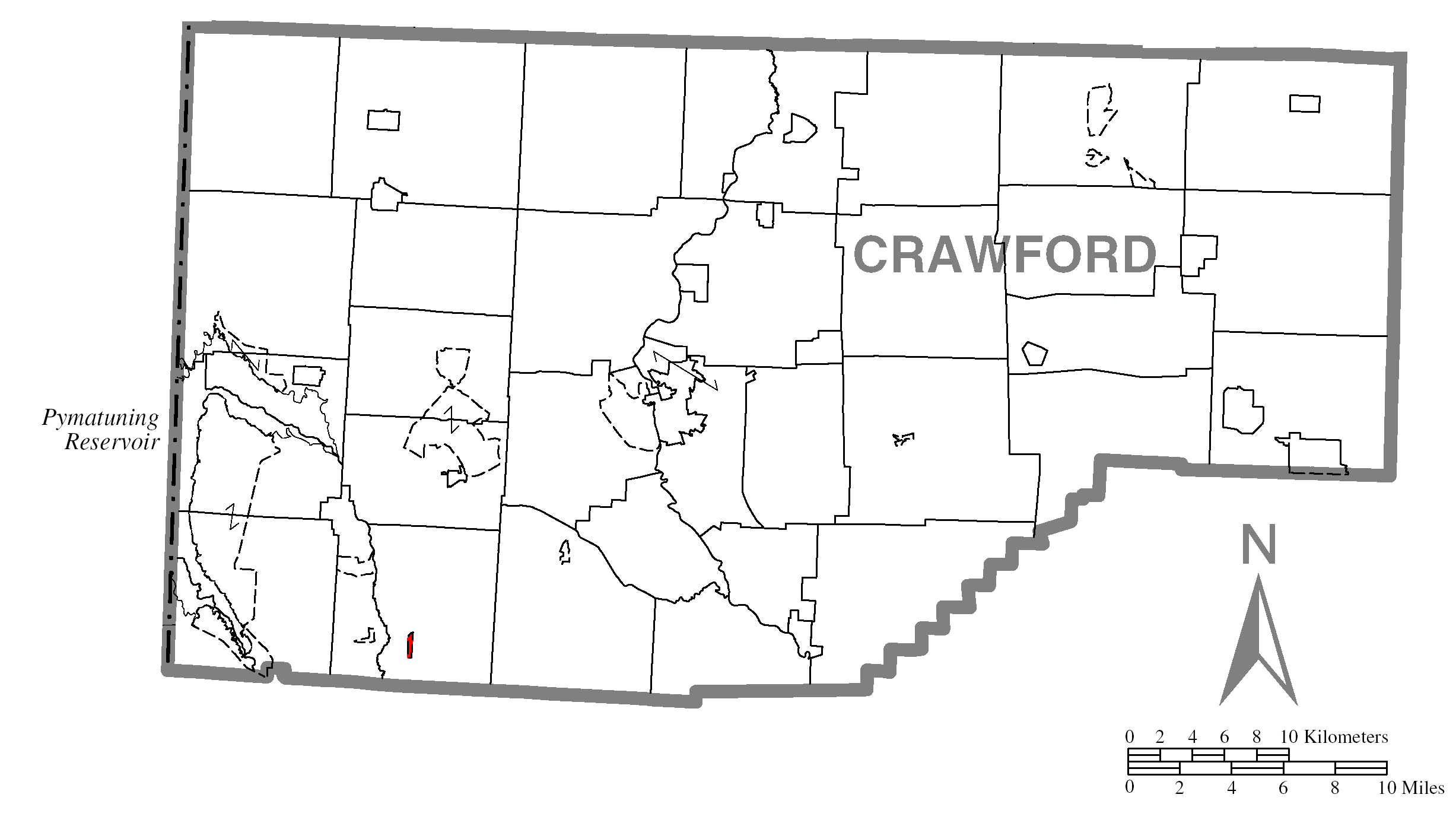
- Location of Atlantic in Crawford County

- Location of Crawford County in Pennsylvania
- Coordinates: 41°30′22″N 80°20′18″W
- Country: United States
- State: Pennsylvania
- County: Crawford County
- Township: East Fallowfield

Area
  - Total: 0.16 sq mi (0.41 km^{2})
  - Land: 0.16 sq mi (0.41 km^{2})
  - Water: 0 sq mi (0.00 km^{2})
- Elevation: 1,147 ft (350 m)

Population (2020)
  - Total: 113
  - Density: 722/sq mi (278.6/km^{2})
- Time zone: UTC-5 (EST)
  - Summer (DST): UTC-4 (EDT)
- ZIP code: 16111
- Area code: 814
- FIPS code: 42-03440

Atlantic is a census-designated place (CDP) in Crawford County, Pennsylvania, United States. As of the 2020 census, Atlantic had a population of 113.

== History ==
The Bridge in East Fallowfield Township was listed on the National Register of Historic Places in 1988. On May 31, 1985, Atlantic was almost completely destroyed by an F4 tornado, 23 people were killed.

== Geography ==
Atlantic is located in southwestern Crawford County at 41°30′22″N 80°20′18″W (41.506012, -80.338452), in the southwestern part of East Fallowfield Township.

According to the United States Census Bureau, the CDP has a total area of 0.15 square miles (0.38 km^{2}), all land.

== Demographics ==
Historical population
| Census | Pop. | Note | %± |
|---|---|---|---|
| 2020 | 113 | | — |
U.S. Decennial Census

As of the census of 2000, there were 43 people, 12 households, and 9 families residing in the CDP. The population density was 294.7 inhabitants per square mile (113.8/km^{2}). There were 15 housing units at an average density of 102.8 per square mile (39.7/km^{2}). The racial makeup of the CDP was 100.00% White.

There were 12 households, out of which 58.3% had children under the age of 18 living with them, 75.0% were married couples living together, none had a female householder with no husband present, and 16.7% were non-families. 16.7% of all households were made up of individuals, and none had someone living alone who was 65 years of age or older. The average household size was 3.58 and the average family size was 4.10.

In the CDP, the population was spread out, with 41.9% under the age of 18, 2.3% from 18 to 24, 41.9% from 25 to 44, 11.6% from 45 to 64, and 2.3% who were 65 years of age or older. The median age was 28 years. For every 100 females, there were 95.5 males. For every 100 females age 18 and over, there were 92.3 males.

The median income for a household in the CDP was $25,000, and the median income for a family was $26,250. Males had a median income of $26,250 versus $0 for females. The per capita income for the CDP was $6,534. 17.2% of the population and 16.7% of families were below the poverty line. None under the age of 18 or 65 and older were living below the poverty line.

== Notable person ==
- Maxwell Anderson, Pulitzer Prize-winning author born here
