= GOES 6 =

NOAA weather satellite

GOES-6
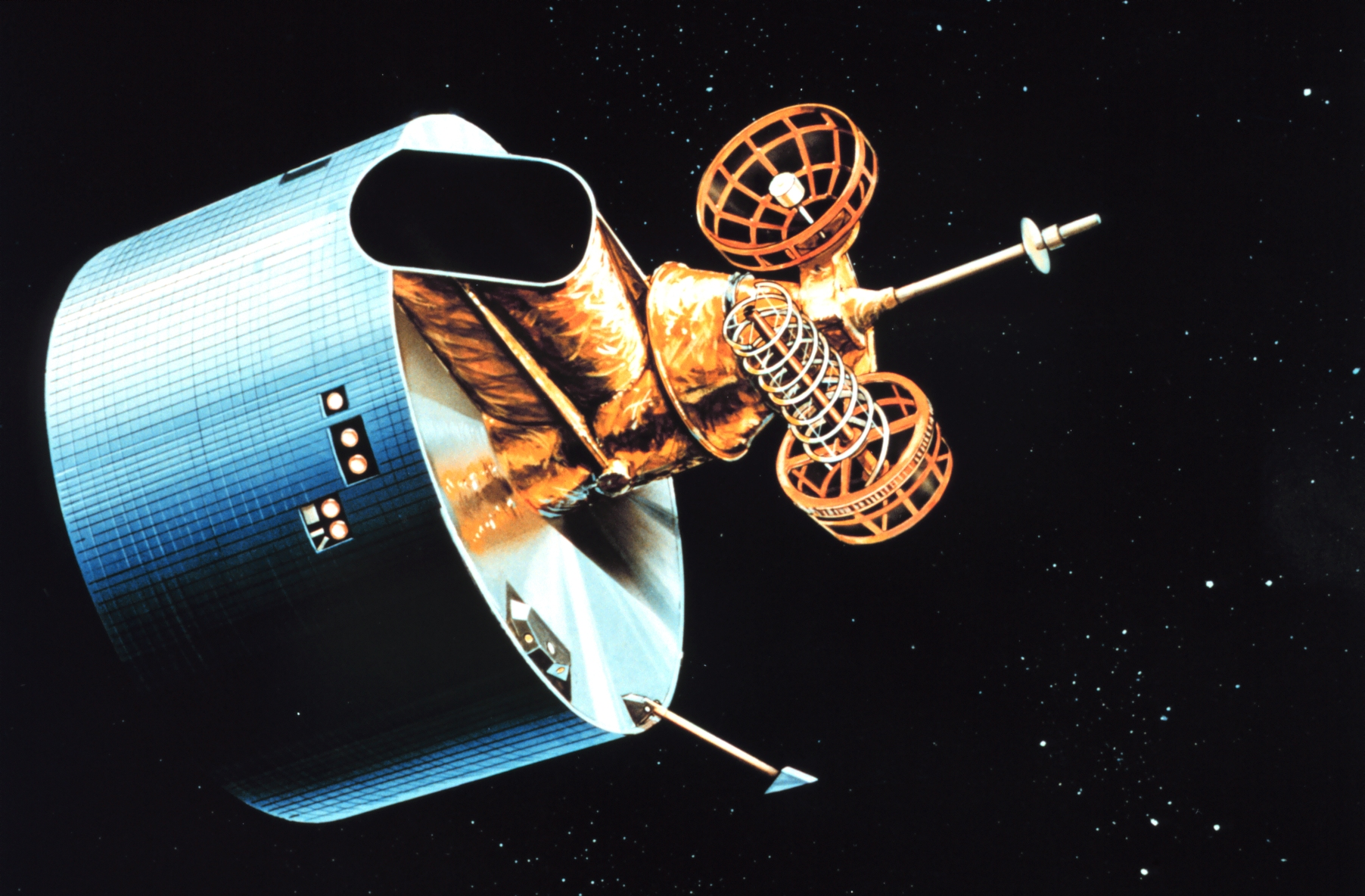
- Artist's impression of an HS-371 derived GOES satellite
- Mission type: Weather satellite
- Operator: NOAA / NASA
- COSPAR ID: 1983-041A
- SATCAT no.: 14050
- Mission duration: 7 years (planned); 6 years (VISSR); 9 years (achieved)

Spacecraft properties
- Bus: HS-371
- Manufacturer: Hughes
- Launch mass: 660 kilograms (1,460 lb)

Start of mission
- Launch date: 28 April 1983, 22:26 UTC
- Rocket: Delta 3914
- Launch site: Cape Canaveral LC-17A
- Contractor: McDonnell Douglas

End of mission
- Disposal: Decommissioned
- Deactivated: 19 May 1992

Orbital parameters
- Reference system: Geocentric
- Regime: Geostationary
- Longitude: 135° West (1983-1984); 97° West (1984); 108° West (1984-1987); 135° West (1987-1992)
- Slot: GOES-WEST (1983-1984, 1987-1992)
- Semi-major axis: 42,151.0 kilometers (26,191.4 mi)
- Perigee altitude: 35,759.4 kilometers (22,219.9 mi)
- Apogee altitude: 35,800.9 kilometers (22,245.6 mi)
- Inclination: 14.7°
- Period: 1,435.1 minutes
- Geostationary Operational Environmental Satellite (First Generation)

GOES-6, known as GOES-F before becoming operational, was a geostationary weather satellite which was operated by the United States National Oceanic and Atmospheric Administration as part of the Geostationary Operational Environmental Satellite system. Launched in 1983, it was used for weather forecasting in the United States.

GOES-6 was built by Hughes Space and Communications, and was based on the HS-371 satellite bus. At launch it had a mass of 660 kilograms (1,460 lb), with an expected operational lifespan of around seven years.

== Launch ==
GOES-F was launched using a Delta 3914 carrier rocket flying from Launch Complex 17A at the Cape Canaveral Air Force Station. The launch occurred at 22:26 GMT on 28 April 1983.

== Orbit ==
The launch successfully placed GOES-F into a geosynchronous transfer orbit, from which it raised itself to geostationary orbit by means of an onboard Star 27 apogee motor, with insertion occurring on 9 May 1983.

Following insertion into geosynchronous orbit, GOES-6 was positioned at 135° West. In 1984 it was moved, initially to 97° West, and later to 108° West to cover for the failure of the Visible Infrared Spin-Scan Radiometer on GOES-5. After GOES-7 replaced GOES-5 in 1987, GOES-6 was returned to 135° West, where it remained for the rest of its operational life. Its imager had failed on 21 January 1989, leaving GOES-7 as the only operational GOES satellite for over five years, until the launch of GOES-8 in 1994. Following this failure, it remained operational as a relay satellite until it was retired to a graveyard orbit on 19 May 1992.

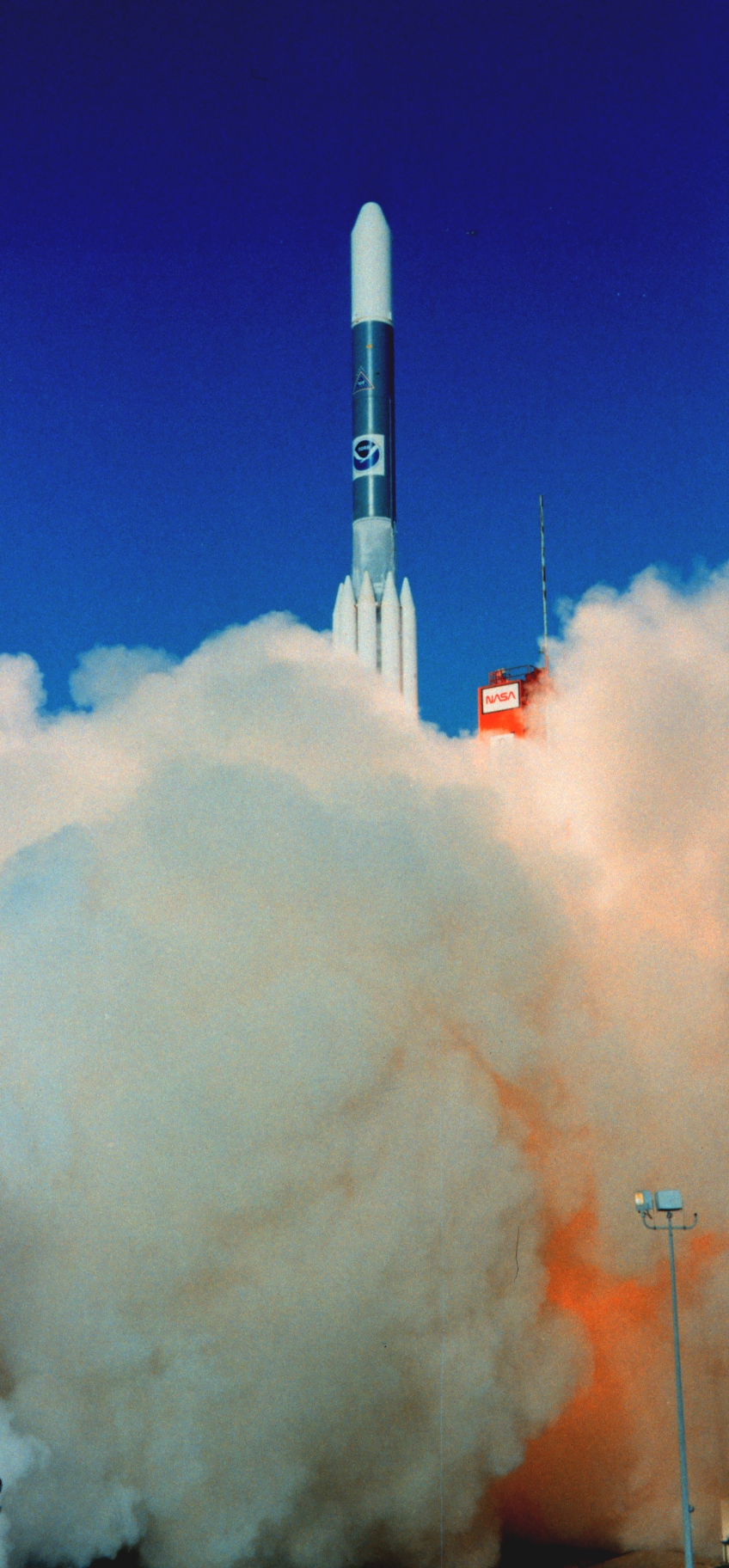
Launch of GOES-F on a Delta 3914

== See also ==
- 1983 in spaceflight
