= Coalburg, Ohio =

Unincorporated tract in Ohio, US

Coordinates: 41°11′35″N 80°35′17″W

Coalburg, Ohio, rarely Coalburgh, is an unincorporated tract in northwestern Hubbard Township, Trumbull County, at approximately 41 degrees and 11 minutes North, 80 degrees and 35 minutes West. It was never a city, a town or a village. Its only official station, a post office, was closed in 1913, when the dwindling population could no longer support it. Although listed in the 1940 census enumeration district descriptions as a separate entity to the Hubbard township, no population figures were recorded.

During the late 19th century, miners who worked the nearby coalfields and their families resided in Coalburg. The settlement had an active business district and houses of worship. Several railroads transported coal from Coalburg’s mines to iron foundries in Youngstown, Ohio, and beyond. National press attention was focused on Coalburg during a regional coal miners’ strike in 1873, when mine owners transported newly arrived immigrants, Italians and Swedes, from eastern seaports and African Americans from Virginia to break the miners’ labor action.
