= 1975 in spaceflight =

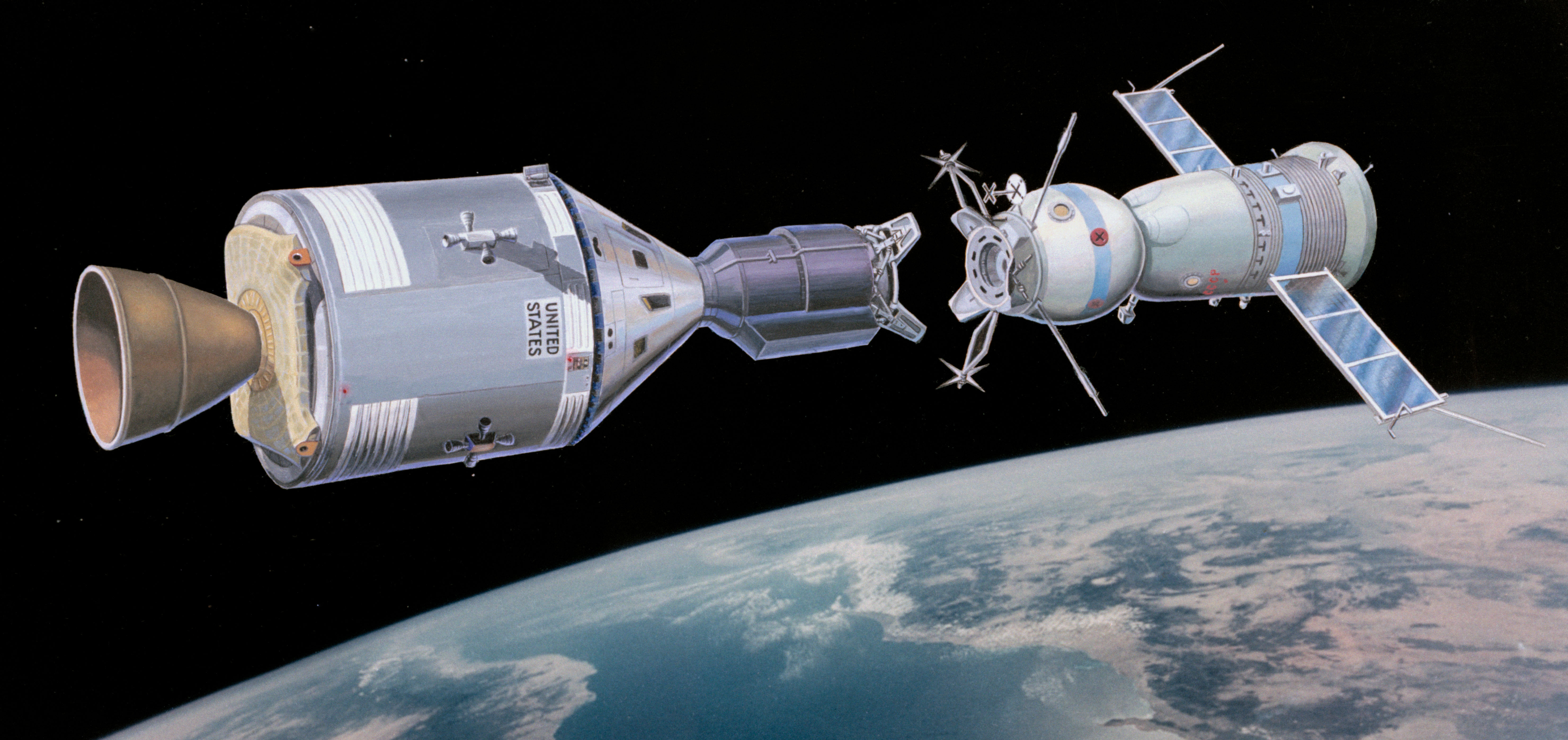
- Artist's impression of the ASTP docking

Orbital launches
- First: 10 January
- Last: 27 December
- Total: 132
- Catalogued: 125

National firsts
- Satellite: India

Rockets
- Maiden flights: Atlas SLV-3D Centaur-D1AR; Delta 3000; Diamant-BP4; Long March 2C; N-I; Scout F-1; Titan III(34)B
- Retirements: Atlas SLV-3D Centaur-D1A; Delta 1000; Diamant-BP4; Saturn IB; Scout F-1

Crewed flights
- Orbital: 4
- Suborbital: 1
- Total travellers: 9

1975 in spaceflight

In 1975, several notable events occurred in spaceflight, including the launches of Venera 9 and 10 and their Venus arrivals, the launches of the Viking Mars missions, the joint American-Soviet Apollo–Soyuz Test Project (ASTP), the failure of Soyuz 7K-T 39, and the launch of Aryabhatta, India's first satellite.

- The Venera 9 mission was launched 8 June 1975 and on 20 October 1975 became the first spacecraft to orbit Venus; two days later its lander returned the first images from the surface of any planet (other than Earth).
- Venera 10 was launched on 14 June 1975; it entered orbit of Venus on 23 October 1975 and its lander arrived on the surface of Venus on 25 October 1975. Both Venera 9 and Venera 10 returned various scientific observations of Venus and black-and-white television pictures from the planet's surface.
- Viking 1 was launched on 20 August 1975 and Viking 2 was launched 9 September 1975. This orbiter/lander mission was to photograph the surface of Mars in 1976.
- The Apollo-Soyuz Test Project was a collaboration between the United States and the Soviet Union that saw an end to the space race. The mission was launched on 15 July 1975, with the Soyuz returning on 21 July and Apollo on 24 July.
- On 5 April, Soyuz 7K-T 39 aborted after the second and third stages failed to separate, with the crew pulling over 21 g on a ballistic reentry.
- On 19 April, the first Indian satellite, Aryabhatta, was launched on a Soviet Kosmos-3M.

== Launches ==
- ← Jan
- Feb
- Mar
- Apr
- May
- Jun
- Jul
- Aug
- Sep
- Oct
- Nov
- Dec →

Date and time (UTC)	Rocket	Flight number	Launch site		LSP	
Date and time (UTC)	Payload	Operator	Orbit	Function	Decay (UTC)	Outcome
Date and time (UTC)	Remarks					
=== January ===
10 January; 21:43:37	(Soviet Union) Soyuz		(Soviet Union) Baikonur Site 1/5		(Soviet Union)	
10 January; 21:43:37	(Soviet Union) Soyuz 17		Low Earth (Salyut 4)	Salyut expedition	19 February; 11:03	Successful
10 January; 21:43:37	Crewed flight with two cosmonauts, first mission to Salyut 4					
17 January; 09:00	(Soviet Union) Voskhod		(Soviet Union) Baikonur Site 31/6		(Soviet Union)	
17 January; 09:00	(Soviet Union) Kosmos 702 (Zenit-2M/Gektor #54)	GRU	Low Earth	Reconnaissance	29 January	Successful
21 January; 11:04	(Soviet Union) Kosmos-2		(Soviet Union) Plesetsk Site 133/3		(Soviet Union)	
21 January; 11:04	(Soviet Union) Kosmos 703 (DS-P1-Yu #74)		Low Earth	Radar calibration	20 November	Successful
22 January; 17:55	(United States) Delta 2910	Delta 107	(United States) Vandenberg AFB SLC-2W		(United States)	
22 January; 17:55	(United States) Landsat 2 (ERTS B)	NASA	Sun-synchronous (SSO)	Earth observation	In orbit	Successful
23 January; 11:00	(Soviet Union) Voskhod		(Soviet Union) Plesetsk Site 41/1		(Soviet Union)	
23 January; 11:00	(Soviet Union) Kosmos 704 (Zenit-4MK/Germes #35)	GRU	Low Earth	Reconnaissance	6 February	Successful
28 January; 12:05	(Soviet Union) Kosmos-2		(Soviet Union) Plesetsk Site 133/1		(Soviet Union)	
28 January; 12:05	(Soviet Union) Kosmos 705 (DS-P1-Yu #75)		Low Earth	Radar calibration	18 November	Successful
30 January; 15:02	(Soviet Union) Molniya-M/Blok 2BL		(Soviet Union) Plesetsk Site 41/1		(Soviet Union)	
30 January; 15:02	(Soviet Union) Kosmos 706 (US-K #4)		Molniya orbit	Missile early warning	In orbit	Successful
=== February ===
5 February; 13:15	(Soviet Union) Kosmos-3M		(Soviet Union) Plesetsk Site 132/1		(Soviet Union)	
5 February; 13:15	(Soviet Union) Kosmos 707 (Tselina-O #26)		Low Earth	ELINT	7 September 1980	Successful
6 February; 04:49	(Soviet Union) Molniya-M/Blok ML		(Soviet Union) Plesetsk Site 41/1		(Soviet Union)	
6 February; 04:49	(Soviet Union) Molniya-2 12		Molniya orbit	Communications	4 August 1985	Successful
6 February; 16:35	(France) Diamant BP4		(French Guiana) Guiana Space Centre ELD		(France) CNES	
6 February; 16:35	(France) Starlette	CNES	Low Earth	Geodesy	In orbit	Successful
6 February; 22:04	(United States) Delta 2914	Delta 108	(United States) Cape Canaveral SLC-17B		(United States) USAF	
6 February; 22:04	(United States) SMS-2	NASA	Geostationary	Weather	In orbit	Successful
12 February; 03:30	(Soviet Union) Kosmos-3M		(Soviet Union) Plesetsk Site 132/1		(Soviet Union)	
12 February; 03:30	(Soviet Union) Kosmos 708 (Sfera #13)		Low Earth	Geodesy	In orbit	Successful
12 February; 14:30	(Soviet Union) Voskhod		(Soviet Union) Plesetsk Site 41/1		(Soviet Union)	
12 February; 14:30	(Soviet Union) Kosmos 709 (Zenit-4MK/Germes #36)	GRU	Low Earth	Reconnaissance	25 February	Successful
20 February; 23:35	(United States) Atlas SLV-3D Centaur-D1A	AC-33				
20 February; 23:35	(United Nations) Intelsat IV F-6	Intelsat	Intended: Geostationary	Communications	20 February	Launch failure
20 February; 23:35	Error during booster separation caused a reset of the guidance computer, leading to the loss of control. Range safety sent the flight termination command at T+413 seconds.					
24 February; 05:25	(Japan) M-3C		(Japan) Kagoshima Space Center LP-M		(Japan) ISAS	
24 February; 05:25	(Japan) SRATS (Taiyo)	ISAS	Highly elliptical orbit	Ionosphere research	29 June 1980	Successful
26 February; 09:00	(Soviet Union) Voskhod		(Soviet Union) Baikonur Site 31/6		(Soviet Union)	
26 February; 09:00	(Soviet Union) Kosmos 710 (Zenit-4MK/Germes #37)	GRU	Low Earth	Reconnaissance	12 March	Successful
14:01; 28 February	(Soviet Union) Kosmos-3M		(Soviet Union) Plesetsk Site 132/2		(Soviet Union)	
14:01; 28 February	(Soviet Union) Kosmos 711 to 718 (Strela-1M × 8)		Low Earth	Communications	In orbit	Successful
=== March ===
10 March; 04:41	(United States) Titan III(34)B		(United States) Vandenberg AFB SLC-4W		(United States) USAF	
10 March; 04:41	(United States) Jumpseat 4 (OPS 2439)	NRO	Molniya orbit	SIGINT	In orbit	Successful
12 March; 08:55	(Soviet Union) Voskhod		(Soviet Union) Baikonur Site 31/6		(Soviet Union)	
12 March; 08:55	(Soviet Union) Kosmos 719 (Zenit-4MK/Germes #38)	GRU	Low Earth	Reconnaissance	25 March	Successful
21 March; 06:50	(Soviet Union) Soyuz-U		(Soviet Union) Plesetsk Site 43/3		(Soviet Union)	
21 March; 06:50	(Soviet Union) Kosmos 720 (Zenit-4MT/Orion #8)	GRU	Low Earth	Reconnaissance, test spacecraft	3 April	Successful
26 March; 08:50	(Soviet Union) Voskhod		(Soviet Union) Plesetsk Site 41/1		(Soviet Union)	
26 March; 08:50	(Soviet Union) Kosmos 721 (Zenit-2M/Gektor #55) and Nauka-5KSA 1L	GRU, AN SSSR	Low Earth	Reconnaissance, research	7 April	Successful
26 March; 08:50	Nauka research payload carried inside Zenit-2M reentry capsule.				7 April	Successful
27 March; 08:00	(Soviet Union) Voskhod		(Soviet Union) Baikonur Site 31/6		(Soviet Union)	
27 March; 08:00	(Soviet Union) Kosmos 722 (Zenit-4MK/Germes #39)	GRU	Low Earth	Reconnaissance	9 April	Successful
27 March; 14:30	(Soviet Union) Kosmos-3M		(Soviet Union) Plesetsk Site 132/1		(Soviet Union)	
27 March; 14:30	(United Nations) Interkosmos 13 (DS-U2-IK #6)	Interkosmos	Low Earth	Radiation belts and upper atmosphere research	2 September 1980	Successful
27 March; 14:30	Cooperative project of Czechoslovakia and the USSR					
=== April ===
1 April; 12:30	(Soviet Union) Vostok-2M		(Soviet Union) Plesetsk Site 41/1		(Soviet Union)	
1 April; 12:30	(Soviet Union) Meteor-1 21		Low Earth	Weather	In orbit	Successful
2 April; 11:00	(Soviet Union) Tsyklon-2		(Soviet Union) Baikonur Site 90/20		(Soviet Union)	
2 April; 11:00	(Soviet Union) Kosmos 723 (US-A #9)		Low Earth	Radar ocean surveillance	In orbit	Successful
5 April; 11:04:54	(Soviet Union) Soyuz		(Soviet Union) Baikonur Site 1/5		(Soviet Union)	
5 April; 11:04:54	(Soviet Union) Soyuz 7K-T #39		Intended: Low Earth (Salyut 4)	Salyut expedition	11:26	Launch failure
5 April; 11:04:54	Crewed flight with two cosmonauts, first and second core stages failed to separate, flight aborted and crew returned on suborbital trajectory					
7 April; 11:00	(Soviet Union) Tsyklon-2		(Soviet Union) Baikonur Site 90/20		(Soviet Union)	
7 April; 11:00	(Soviet Union) Kosmos 724 (US-A #10)		Low Earth	Radar ocean surveillance	In orbit	Successful
8 April; 18:29	(Soviet Union) Kosmos-2		(Soviet Union) Plesetsk Site 133/1		(Soviet Union)	
8 April; 18:29	(Soviet Union) Kosmos 725 (DS-P1-Yu #76)		Low Earth	Radar calibration	6 January 1976	Successful
9 April; 23:58:02	(United States) Delta 1410		(United States) Vandenberg SLC-2W		(United States) NASA	
9 April; 23:58:02	(United States) GEOS-3	NASA	Low Earth	Geodesy	In orbit	Successful
19 April	(Soviet Union) Kosmos-3M		(Soviet Union) Kapustin Yar		(Soviet Union) Interkosmos	
19 April	(India) Aryabhatta	ISRO	Low Earth	X-ray astronomy, aeronomics, and solar physics studies	11 February 1992	Launch success, payload partial failure
19 April	First Indian satellite; payload failed 4–5 days after launch					
=== May ===
7 May; 22:45:01	(United States) Scout F-1		(Italy) San Marco mobile range, Kenya		(Italy) CRS	
7 May; 22:45:01	(United States) SAS 3	NASA	Low Earth	X-ray astronomy	9 April 1979	Successful
24 May; 14:58:10	(Soviet Union) Soyuz		(Soviet Union) Baikonur Site 1/5		(Soviet Union)	
24 May; 14:58:10	(Soviet Union) Soyuz 18		Low Earth (Salyut 4)	Salyut expedition	26 July; 14:18	Successful
24 May; 14:58:10	Crewed flight with two cosmonauts, final mission to Salyut 4					
=== June ===
3 June; 09:00	(Soviet Union) Kosmos-3M		(Soviet Union) Kapustin Yar, Site 107/1		(Soviet Union)	
3 June; 09:00	(United Nations) DS-U3-IK #5	Interkosmos	Intended: Low Earth	Solar radiation research	3 June	Failure
3 June; 13:20	(Soviet Union) Voskhod		(Soviet Union) Plesetsk Cosmodrome, Site 43/3		(Soviet Union)	
3 June; 13:20	(Soviet Union) Kosmos 742 (Zenit-4MK/Germes #43)	GRU	Low Earth	Reconnaissance	15 June	Successful
5 June; 01:37	(Soviet Union) Molniya-M/Blok ML		(Soviet Union) Plesetsk Cosmodrome, Site 41/1		(Soviet Union)	
5 June; 01:37	(Soviet Union) Molniya-1K 30 (Molniya-1K 37L)		Molniya orbit	Communications	25 September 1987	Successful
5 June; 01:37	(France) SRET 2	CNES	Molniya orbit	Technology test	10 July 1988	Successful
8 June; 02:37	(Soviet Union) Proton-K/Blok D		(Soviet Union) Baikonur Cosmodrome, Site 81/24		(Soviet Union)	
8 June; 02:37	(Soviet Union) Venera 9 (4V1 #1) orbiter		Cytherocentric	Venus orbiter	In orbit	Successful
8 June; 02:37	(Soviet Union) Venera 9 (4V1 #1) lander		Cytherocentric	Venus lander	22 October; 05:13 (on Venus)	Successful
8 June; 02:37	First spacecraft to orbit Venus, first spacecraft to return images from the surface of another planet					
8 June; 18:30	(United States) Titan IIID	3D-10	(United States) Vandenberg AFB, SLC-4E		(United States) US Air Force	
8 June; 18:30	(United States) KH-9 10 (Hexagon, OPS 6381)	NRO	Low Earth	Reconnaissance	5 November	Successful
8 June; 18:30	(United States) P-226 1 (SSU 1, OPS 6381)		Low Earth	ELINT	In orbit	Successful
12 June; 08:12	(United States) Delta 2910	Delta 111	(United States) Vandenberg AFB, SLC-2W		(United States)	
12 June; 08:12	(United States) Nimbus 6	NASA, NOAA	Low Earth	Weather	In orbit	Successful
12 June; 12:30	(Soviet Union) Soyuz-U		(Soviet Union) Plesetsk Cosmodrome, Site 43/3		(Soviet Union)	
12 June; 12:30	(Soviet Union) Kosmos 743 (Zenit-4MK/Germes #44)	GRU	Low Earth	Reconnaissance	25 June	Successful
14 June; 03:00	(Soviet Union) Proton-K/Blok D		(Soviet Union) Baikonur Cosmodrome, Site 81/24		(Soviet Union)	
14 June; 03:00	(Soviet Union) Venera 10 (4V1 #2) orbiter		Cytherocentric	Venus orbiter	In orbit	Successful
14 June; 03:00	(Soviet Union) Venera 10 (4V1 #2) lander		Cytherocentric	Venus lander	25 October; 02:17 (on Venus)	Successful
18 June; 09:00	(United States) Atlas SLV-3A Agena-D	5506A	(United States) Cape Canaveral AFS, LC-13		(United States) US Air Force	
18 June; 09:00	(United States) Canyon 6 (AFP-827, OPS 4966)	NRO	High Earth orbit	SIGINT	In orbit	Successful
20 June; 06:54	(Soviet Union) Vostok-2M		(Soviet Union) Plesetsk Cosmodrome, Site 41/1		(Soviet Union)	
20 June; 06:54	(Soviet Union) Kosmos 744 (Tselina-D #7)		Low Earth	ELINT	11 October 1991	Successful
11:43; 21 June	(United States) Delta 1910	Delta 112	(United States) Cape Canaveral AFS, LC-17B		(United States)	
11:43; 21 June	(United States) OSO 8	NASA	Low Earth	Solar research, UV and X-ray astronomy	9 July 1986	Successful
24 June; 12:04	(Soviet Union) Kosmos-2		(Soviet Union) Plesetsk Cosmodrome, Site 133/1		(Soviet Union)	
24 June; 12:04	(Soviet Union) Kosmos 745 (DS-P1-Yu #77)		Low Earth	Radar calibration	12 March 1976	Successful
25 June; 12:59	(Soviet Union) Voskhod		(Soviet Union) Plesetsk Cosmodrome, Site 43/3		(Soviet Union)	
25 June; 12:59	(Soviet Union) Kosmos 746 (Zenit-4MK/Germes #45)	GRU	Low Earth	Reconnaissance	9 July	Successful
27 June; 13:00	(Soviet Union) Voskhod		(Soviet Union) Plesetsk Cosmodrome, Site 41/1		(Soviet Union)	
27 June; 13:00	(Soviet Union) Kosmos 747 (Zenit-2M/Gektor #58)	GRU	Low Earth	Reconnaissance	9 July	Successful
27 June; 13:00	(Soviet Union) Nauka-22KS 1L		Low Earth	Hosted research payload	9 July	Successful
=== July ===
15 July; 14:58:10	(Soviet Union) Soyuz-U		(Soviet Union) Baikonur Site 1/5		(Soviet Union)	
15 July; 14:58:10	(Soviet Union) Soyuz 19		Low Earth (Apollo)	International docking	21 July; 10:50	Successful
15 July; 14:58:10	Crewed flight with two cosmonauts, Soviet contribution to the Apollo Soyuz Test Project					
15 July; 19:50:01	(United States) Saturn IB		(United States) Kennedy LC-39B		(United States) NASA	
15 July; 19:50:01	(United States) Apollo	NASA	Low Earth (Soyuz 19)	International docking	24 July; 21:18	Successful
15 July; 19:50:01	(United States) DM-2	NASA	Low Earth (Apollo)	Docking adaptor	2 August	Successful
15 July; 19:50:01	Crewed flight with three astronauts, American contribution to the Apollo Soyuz Test Project, final flight of the Apollo programme and the Saturn rocket					
26 July; 13:28	(China) Feng Bao 1		(China) Jiquan Satellite Launch Center, LA-2B (Site 138)			
26 July; 13:28	(China) JSSW 1 (CK 1)		Low Earth	Unknown	14 September	Successful
26 July; 13:28	First successful orbital launch of Feng Bao 1.					
=== August ===
20 August; 21:22:00	(United States) Titan IIIE		(United States) Cape Canaveral LC-41		(United States)	
20 August; 21:22:00	(United States) Viking 1 Orbiter	NASA	Areocentric	Mars orbiter	In orbit	Successful
20 August; 21:22:00	(United States) Viking 1 Lander	NASA	Areocentric	Mars lander	20 July 1976; 11:53:06	Successful
20 August; 21:22:00	Lander landed in Chryse Planitia, becoming the first US spacecraft to land on Mars. It operated until 11 November 1982 when communications were lost due to an erroneous command being sent to the spacecraft. Orbiter was deactivated on 17 August 1980.					
=== September ===
9 September; 05:30	(Japan) (United States) N-I	N1F	(Japan) Tanegashima Space Center LP-N (LA-Y1)		(Japan) NASDA	
9 September; 05:30	(Japan) ETS 1 (Kiku 1)	NASDA	Low Earth	Technology test	In orbit	Successful
9 September; 05:30	First flight of N-I, first satellite launched by NASDA					
9 September; 18:39:00	(United States) Titan IIIE		(United States) Cape Canaveral LC-41		(United States)	
9 September; 18:39:00	(United States) Viking 2 Orbiter	NASA	Areocentric	Mars orbiter	In orbit	Successful
9 September; 18:39:00	(United States) Viking 2 Lander	NASA	Areocentric	Mars lander	3 September 1976; 22:58:20	Successful
9 September; 18:39:00	Lander landed in Utopia Planitia and operated until its batteries failed on 11 April 1980. Orbiter was deactivated on 25 July 1978.					
27 September; 08:37	(France) Diamant BP4		(French Guiana) Guiana Space Centre ELD		(France) CNES	
27 September; 08:37	(France) Aura (D-2B)	CNES	Low Earth	Ultraviolet astronomy	30 September 1982	Successful
27 September; 08:37	Last flight of Diamant					
=== October ===
16 October; 22:40:00	(United States) Delta 2914		(United States) Cape Canaveral SLC-17B		(United States) NASA	
16 October; 22:40:00	(United States) GOES 1	NOAA	Geostationary	Meteorology	In orbit	Successful
16 October; 22:40:00	First operational geostationary weather satellite. Deactivated on 7 March 1985					
=== November ===
4 November; 10:12	(Soviet Union) Kosmos-3M		(Soviet Union) Plesetsk Comodrome, Site 132/1		(Soviet Union)	
4 November; 10:12	(Soviet Union) Kosmos 778 (Parus #4)		Low Earth	Navigation, data relay	In orbit	Successful
4 November; 15:19	(Soviet Union) Voskhod		(Soviet Union) Plesetsk Cosmodrome, Site 43/3			
4 November; 15:19	(Soviet Union) Kosmos 779 (Zenit-4MK/Germes #52)	GRU	Low Earth	Reconnaissance	18 November	Successful
14 November; 19:13	(Soviet Union) Molniya-M/Blok ML		(Soviet Union) Plesetsk Cosmodrome, Site 43/3		(Soviet Union)	
14 November; 19:13	(Soviet Union) Molniya-3 3 (Molniya-3 13L)		Molniya orbit	Communications	19 November 2017	Successful
17 November; 14:36:37	(Soviet Union) Soyuz-U		(Soviet Union) Baikonur Cosmodrome, Site 1/5		(Soviet Union)	
17 November; 14:36:37	(Soviet Union) Soyuz 20		Low Earth (Salyut 4)	Uncrewed test flight, biology	16 February 1976; 02:24	Successful
17 November; 14:36:37	Last Soyuz flight to the Salyut 4 station					
20 November; 02:06:48	(United States) Delta 2910	Delta 117	(United States) Cape Canaveral AFS, LC-17B		(United States) US Air Force	
20 November; 02:06:48	(United States) Explorer 55 (AE E)	NASA	Elliptical low Earth	Atmosphere research	10 June 1981	Successful
21 November; 09:20	(Soviet Union) Voskhod		(Soviet Union) Baikonur Cosmodrome, Site 31/6		(Soviet Union)	
21 November; 09:20	(Soviet Union) Kosmos 780 (Zenit-2M #62/Gektor #62)	GRU	Low Earth	Reconnaissance	3 December	Successful
21 November; 09:20	(Soviet Union) Nauka-20KS 2L		Low Earth	Research	3 December	Successful
21 November; 17:11	(Soviet Union) Kosmos-3M		(Soviet Union) Plesetsk Cosmodrome, Site 132/1		(Soviet Union)	
21 November; 17:11	(Soviet Union) Kosmos 781 (Tselina-O #28)		Low Earth	ELINT	26 November 1980	Successful
25 November; 17:00	(Soviet Union) Soyuz-U		(Soviet Union) Plesetsk Cosmodrome, Site 43/3		(Soviet Union)	
25 November; 17:00	(Soviet Union) (United Nations) Kosmos 782 (Bion #3)	Institute of Biomedical Problems	Low Earth	Biology	15 December; 04:48	Successful
26 November; 03:27	(China) Long March 2A		(China) Jiquan Satellite Launch Center, LA-2B (Site 138)		(China) MASI	
26 November; 03:27	(China) FSW-0 1		Low Earth	Reconnaissance	29 December	Successful
26 November; 03:27	First successful launch of Long March 2.					
28 November; 00:10	(Soviet Union) Kosmos-3M		(Soviet Union) Plesetsk Cosmodrome, Site 132/1		(Soviet Union)	
28 November; 00:10	(Soviet Union) Kosmos 783 (Strela-2M #11)		Low Earth	Communications	In orbit	Successful
=== December ===
3 December; 10:00	(Soviet Union) Voskhod		(Soviet Union) Plesetsk Cosmodrome, Site 43/3		(Soviet Union)	
3 December; 10:00	(Soviet Union) Kosmos 784 (Zenit-2M/Gektor #63)	GRU	Low Earth	Reconnaissance	15 December	Successful
3 December; 10:00	(Soviet Union) Nauka-22KS 2L		Low Earth	Hosted research payload	15 December	Successful
4 December; 20:38	(United States) Titan IIID	3D-10	(United States) Vandenberg AFB, SLC-4E		(United States) US Air Force	
4 December; 20:38	(United States) KH-9 11 (Hexagon, OPS 4428)	NRO	Low Earth	Reconnaissance	1 April 1976	Successful
4 December; 20:38	(United States) S3 2 (S73-6, OPS 5547)	STP	Elliptical low Earth	Research	1 May 1978	Successful
6 December; 03:35	(United States) Scout-F1	196C	(United States) Vandenberg AFB, SLC-5		(United States) US Air Force	
6 December; 03:35	(United States) DADE-A		Intended: Low polar Earth	Atmosphere density research	6 December	Failure
6 December; 03:35	(United States) DADE-B		Intended: Low polar Earth	Atmosphere density research	6 December	Failure
11 December; 17:00	(Soviet Union) Kosmos-3M		(Soviet Union) Plesetsk Cosmodrome, Site 132/1		(Soviet Union)	
11 December; 17:00	(United Nations) Interkosmos 14 (DS-U2-IK #7)	Interkosmos		Magnetosphere, ionosphere, micrometeorites research	27 February 1983	Successful
11 December; 17:00	Cooperative project of the Hungarian People's Republic, People's Republic of Bulgaria, Czechoslovakia and the USSR					
12 December; 12:45	(Soviet Union) Tsyklon-2		(Soviet Union) Baikonur Cosmodrome, Site 90/19		(Soviet Union)	
12 December; 12:45	(Soviet Union) Kosmos 785 (US-A #11)		Low Earth	Radar ocean surveillance	In orbit	Successful
13 December; 01:56	(United States) Delta 3914	Delta 118	(United States) Cape Canaveral AFS, LC-17A		(United States) US Air Force	
13 December; 01:56	(United States) Satcom 1	RCA Americom	Geostationary	Communications	In orbit	Successful
13 December; 01:56	Maiden flight of Delta 3914					
14 December; 05:15	(United States) Titan III(23)C	3C-29	(United States) Cape Canaveral AFS, SLC-40		(United States) US Air Force	
14 December; 05:15	(United States) DSP 5 (OPS 3165)	USAF	Geostationary	Missile early warning	In orbit	Successful
16 December; 09:19	(China) Feng Bao 1		(China) Jiquan Satellite Launch Center, LA-2B (Site 138)			
16 December; 09:19	(China) JSSW 2 (CK 2)		Low Earth	Unknown	27 January 1976	Successful
16 December; 09:50	(Soviet Union) Voskhod		(Soviet Union) Baikonur Cosmodrome, Site 31/6		(Soviet Union)	
16 December; 09:50	(Soviet Union) Kosmos 786 (Zenit-4MK/Germes #53)	GRU	Low Earth	Reconnaissance	29 December	Successful
17 December; 11:06	(Soviet Union) Molniya-M/Blok ML		(Soviet Union) Plesetsk Cosmodrome, Site 43/3		(Soviet Union)	
17 December; 11:06	(Soviet Union) Molniya-2 15		Molniya orbit	Communications	28 June 1990	Successful
19 December; 14:00	(Soviet Union) Kosmos-3M		(Soviet Union) Plesetsk Cosmodrome, Site 132/1		(Soviet Union)	
19 December; 14:00	(Soviet Union) DS-P1-M #7		Intended: Low Earth	ASAT target	19 December	Failure
22 December; 02:08	(Soviet Union) Molniya-M/Blok SO-L		(Soviet Union) Baikonur Cosmodrome, Site 31/6		(Soviet Union)	
22 December; 02:08	(Soviet Union) Prognoz 4		Highly elliptical orbit	Solar and magnetosphere research	18 December 1977	Successful
22 December; 13:00	(Soviet Union) Proton-K/Blok DM		(Soviet Union) Baikonur Cosmodrome, Site 81/24		(Soviet Union)	
22 December; 13:00	(Soviet Union) Raduga 1 (Gran 11L)		Geostationary	Communications	In orbit	Successful
25 December; 19:00	(Soviet Union) Vostok-2M		(Soviet Union) Plesetsk Cosmodrome, Site 41/1		(Soviet Union)	
25 December; 19:00	(Soviet Union) Meteor-1 23		Low Earth	Weather	In orbit	Successful
27 December; 10:22	(Soviet Union) Molniya-M/Blok ML		(Soviet Union) Plesetsk Cosmodrome, Site 43/3		(Soviet Union)	
27 December; 10:22	(Soviet Union) Molniya-3 4 (Molniya-3 15L)		Molniya orbit	Communications	17 October 1986	Successful

- ← Jan
- Feb
- Mar
- Apr
- May
- Jun
- Jul
- Aug
- Sep
- Oct
- Nov
- Dec →

== Deep space rendezvous ==
Date	Spacecraft	Event	Remarks
16 March	Mariner 10	3rd flyby of Mercury	Closest approach: 327 kilometres (203 mi)
20 October	Venera 9	Cytherocentric orbit insertion	First orbiter of Venus
22 October	Venera 9 lander	Venerian landing	Landed at 05:13 UTC; first images from Venus surface
23 October	Venera 10	Cytherocentric orbit insertion	
25 October	Venera 10 lander	Venerian landing	Landed at 05:17 UTC

== EVAs ==
Start date/time	Duration	End time	Spacecraft	Crew	Remarks
