= GOES 3 =

NOAA weather satellite

GOES-3
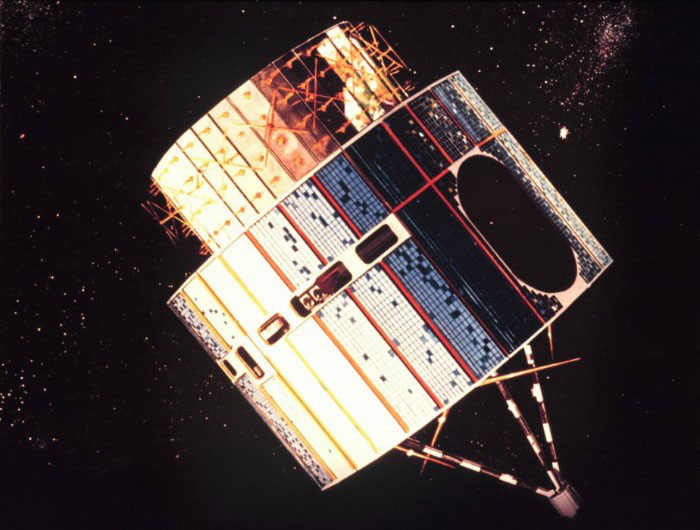
- Artist's impression of an SMS-series GOES satellite in orbit
- Mission type: Weather satellite
- Operator: NOAA
- COSPAR ID: 1978-062A
- SATCAT no.: 10953
- Mission duration: 38 years (achieved); 48 years, 4 months and 5 days (in orbit)

Spacecraft properties
- Spacecraft type: SMS
- Manufacturer: Ford Aerospace
- Launch mass: 627 kilograms (1,382 lb)

Start of mission
- Launch date: 16 June 1978, 10:49 UTC
- Rocket: Delta 2914
- Launch site: Cape Canaveral LC-17B
- Contractor: McDonnell Douglas

End of mission
- Disposal: Decommissioned
- Deactivated: 29 June 2016

Orbital parameters
- Reference system: Geocentric
- Regime: Geostationary
- Longitude: 135° West (1978-1981); 90° West (1982-1984); 185° West (1985-1987); 129° West (1987-1990); 175° West (1990-1995); 102-110° West (1996—)
- Slot: GOES-WEST (1978-1981)
- Eccentricity: 0.01425
- Perigee altitude: 35,469.10 kilometers (22,039.48 mi)
- Apogee altitude: 36,679.20 kilometers (22,791.40 mi)
- Inclination: 7.100 degrees
- Period: 24 hours
- Geostationary Operational Environmental Satellite (Synchronous Meteorological Satellite) Dervived

GOES-3, known as GOES-C before becoming operational, was an American geostationary weather and communications satellite. It was originally built for the National Oceanic and Atmospheric Administration as part of the Geostationary Operational Environmental Satellite system, and was launched in June 1978. It was positioned in geostationary orbit, from where it was initially used for weather forecasting in the United States. After ceasing to function as a weather satellite in 1989, it was used as a communications satellite, and spent over thirty-eight years in operation. GOES-3 was decommissioned 29 June 2016 at the Center for Southeastern Tropical Advanced Remote Sensing facility in Miami, Florida.

GOES-3 was built by Ford Aerospace, and was based on the satellite bus developed for the SMS programme. At launch it had a mass of 627 kilograms (1,382 lb).

== Launch ==
GOES-C was launched using a Delta 2914 carrier rocket flying from Launch Complex 17B at the Cape Canaveral Air Force Station. The launch occurred at 10:49 GMT (5:49 a.m. local time) on 16 June 1978, just two minutes short of a year after the previous satellite, GOES-2.

== Orbit ==
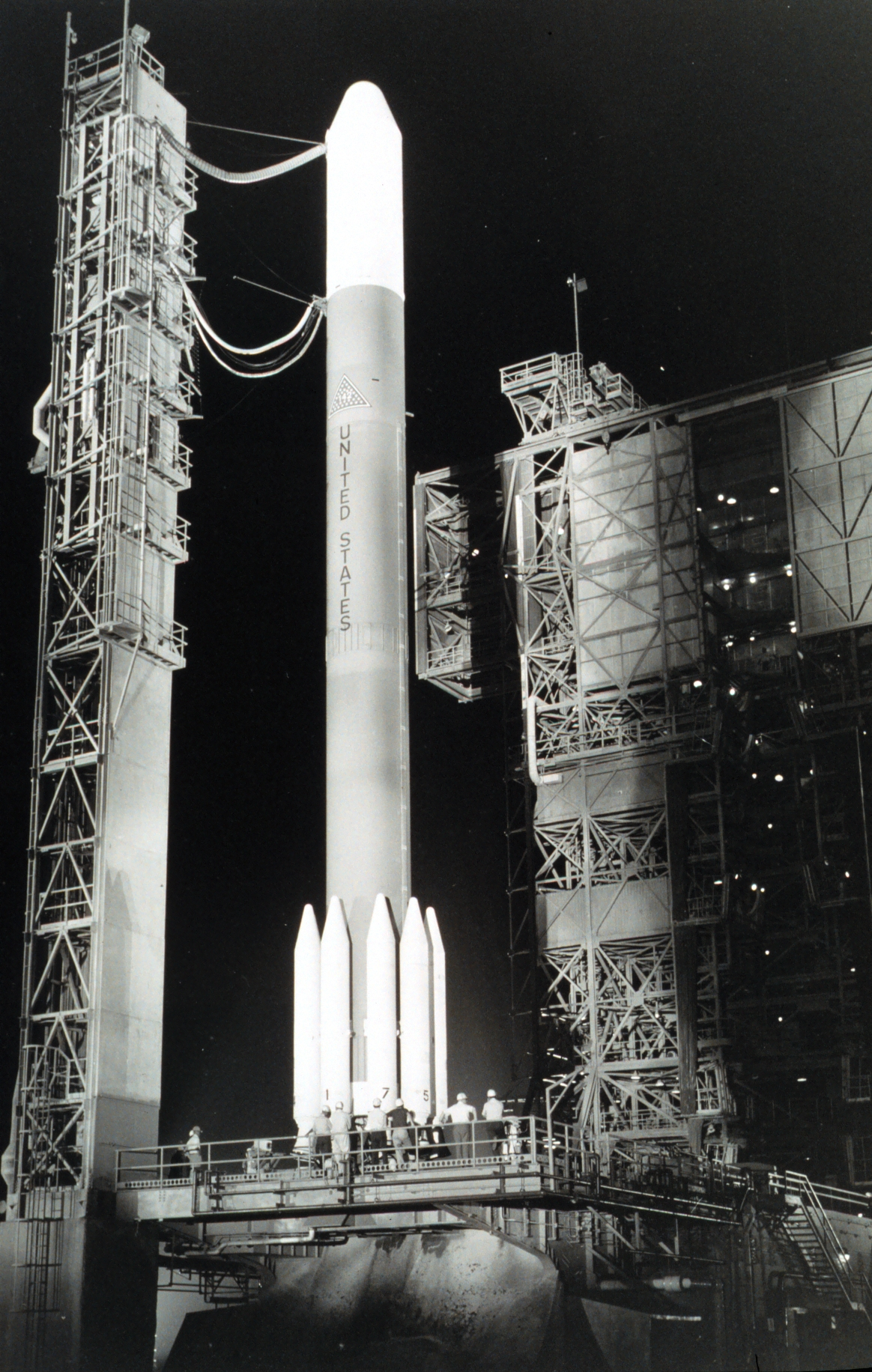
GOES-C on a Delta 2914 before launch

The launch successfully placed GOES-C into a geostationary transfer orbit, from which it raised itself to geostationary orbit using an onboard SVM-5 apogee motor. Its insertion into geosynchronous orbit occurred at 03:22 on 17 June.

GOES-C underwent on-orbit testing, and was subsequently redesignated GOES-3. It replaced GOES 1 in service, and was initially operated at 135° West. In 1981, it was moved to 90° West, arriving in 1982, before departing again in 1984. In 1985 it arrived back at 135° West. In 1987 it was moved to 129° West, where it operated until it became unusable for meteorological studies in 1989.

After ceasing operations as a weather satellite, GOES-3 was reassigned for use as a communications satellite. In 1990, it was relocated to 175° West, and in 1995 it was moved again, and was stationed between 102° and 110° West since 1996. Organisations which used GOES-3 for communications included Peacesat, who used it to provide communications services to islands in the Pacific Ocean; the University of Hawaii who used it to broadcast educational programmes; the US National Science Foundation, who used it for communications with the Amundsen–Scott South Pole Station; and the Rosenstiel School of Marine, Atmospheric, and Earth Science.

== See also ==
- 1978 in spaceflight
- TDRS-1
