= GOES 5 =

NOAA weather satellite

GOES-5
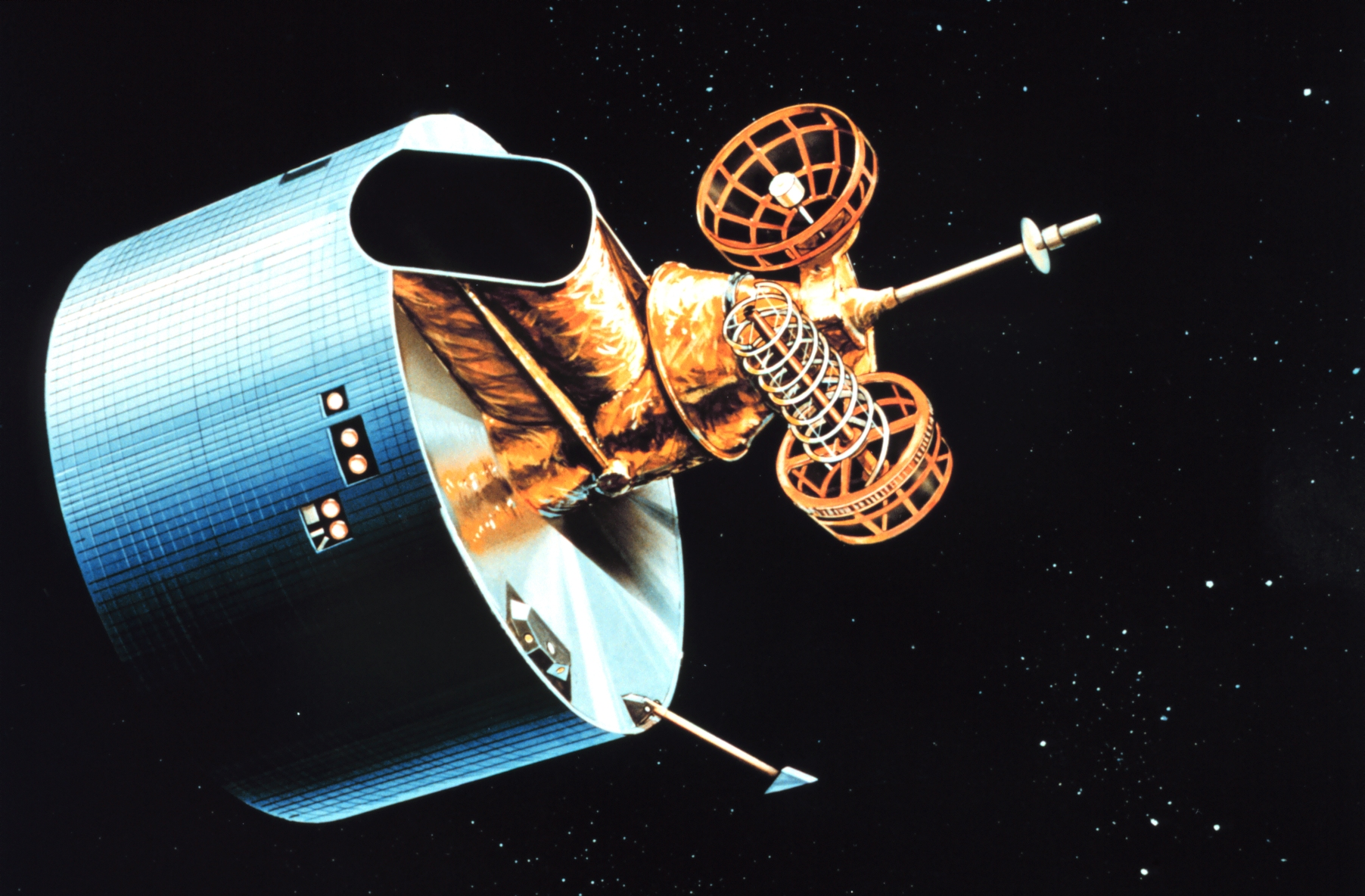
- Artist's impression of an HS-371 derived GOES satellite
- Mission type: Weather satellite
- Operator: NOAA / NASA
- COSPAR ID: 1981-049A
- SATCAT no.: 12472
- Mission duration: 7 years (planned); 3 years (VISSR); 9 years (total)

Spacecraft properties
- Bus: HS-371
- Manufacturer: Hughes
- Launch mass: 660 kilograms (1,460 lb)

Start of mission
- Launch date: 22 May 1981, 22:29 UTC
- Rocket: Delta 3914
- Launch site: Cape Canaveral LC-17A
- Contractor: McDonnell Douglas

End of mission
- Disposal: Decommissioned
- Deactivated: 18 July 1990

Orbital parameters
- Reference system: Geocentric
- Regime: Geostationary
- Longitude: 85° West (1981); 75° West (1981-1987); 106° West (1987-1988); 65° West (1988-1989)
- Slot: GOES-EAST (1981-1987)
- Semi-major axis: 42,146.0 kilometers (26,188.3 mi)
- Perigee altitude: 35,749.8 kilometers (22,213.9 mi)
- Apogee altitude: 35,801.1 kilometers (22,245.8 mi)
- Inclination: 14.6 degrees
- Period: 1,435.2 minutes
- Geostationary Operational Environmental Satellite (First Generation)

GOES-5, known as GOES-E before becoming operational, was a geostationary weather satellite which was operated by the United States National Oceanic and Atmospheric Administration as part of the Geostationary Operational Environmental Satellite system. Launched in 1981, it was used for weather forecasting in the United States.

== History ==
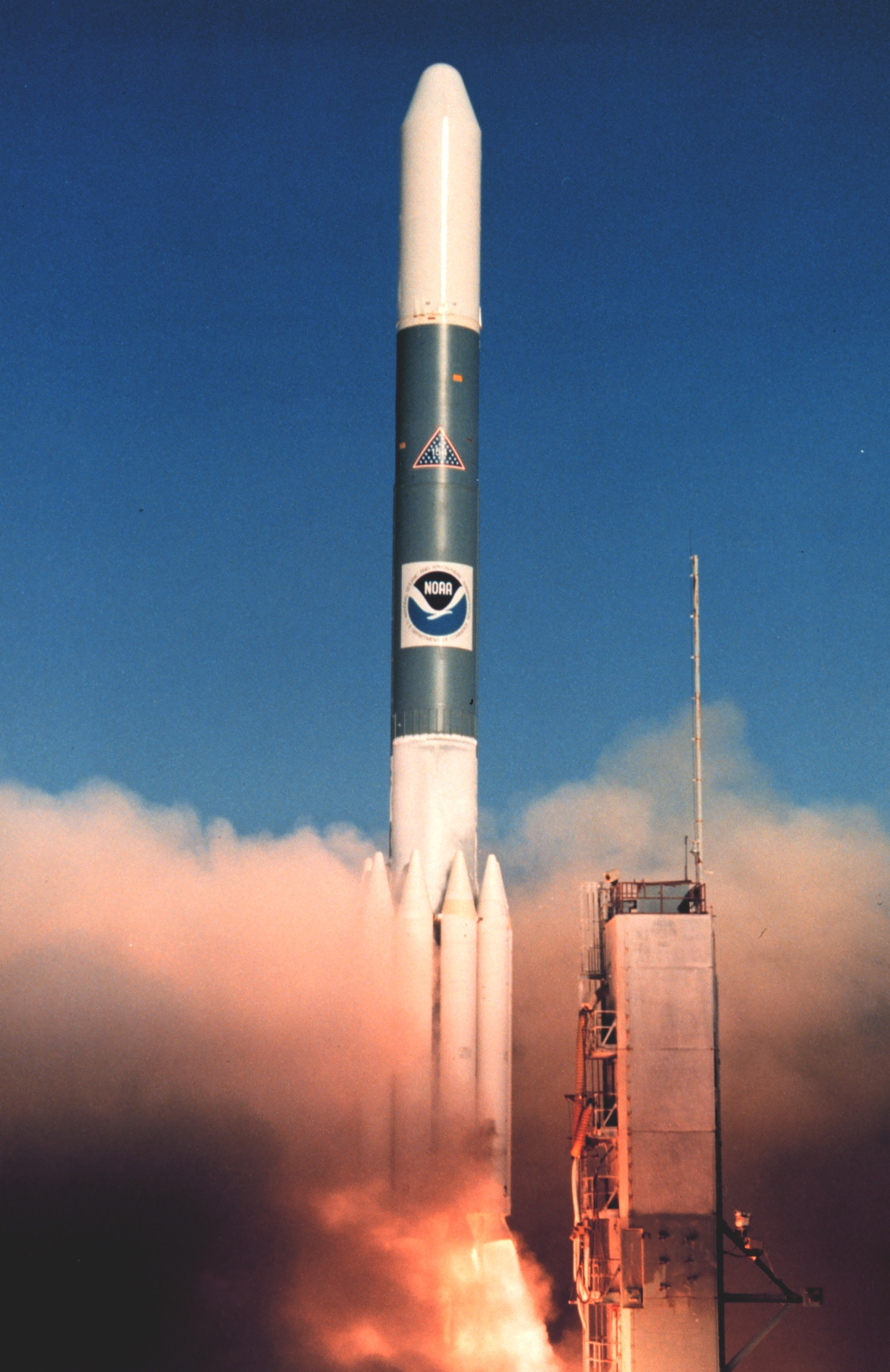
Launch of GOES-E on a Delta 3914

GOES-5 was built by Hughes Space and Communications, and was based on the HS-371 satellite bus. At launch it had a mass of 660 kilograms (1,460 lb), with an expected operational lifespan of around seven years.

GOES-E was launched using a Delta 3914 carrier rocket flying from Launch Complex 17A at the Cape Canaveral Air Force Station. The launch occurred at 22:29 GMT on 22 May 1981. The launch successfully placed GOES-E into a geostationary transfer orbit, from which it raised itself to geostationary orbit on 2 June by means of an onboard Star 27 apogee motor.

Following insertion into geostationary orbit, GOES-5 was briefly placed at a longitude 85° West, however by the end of 1981, it had been moved to 75° West. It remained there until 1987, when it was moved to 106° West. In 1988 it was relocated to 65° West, where it operated until 1989. The primary instrument carried aboard GOES-5, the Visible Infrared Spin-Scan Radiometer or VISSR, failed in 1984. The GOES-1 and GOES-4 satellites were reactivated to fill the gap in coverage until a replacement could be launched. It was finally replaced by the ground spare, GOES-H, in 1987 after its intended replacement, GOES-G, failed to reach orbit. GOES-5 was retired to a graveyard orbit on 18 July 1990.

== See also ==
- 1981 in spaceflight
