= GOES-G =

American weather satellite destroyed in 1986

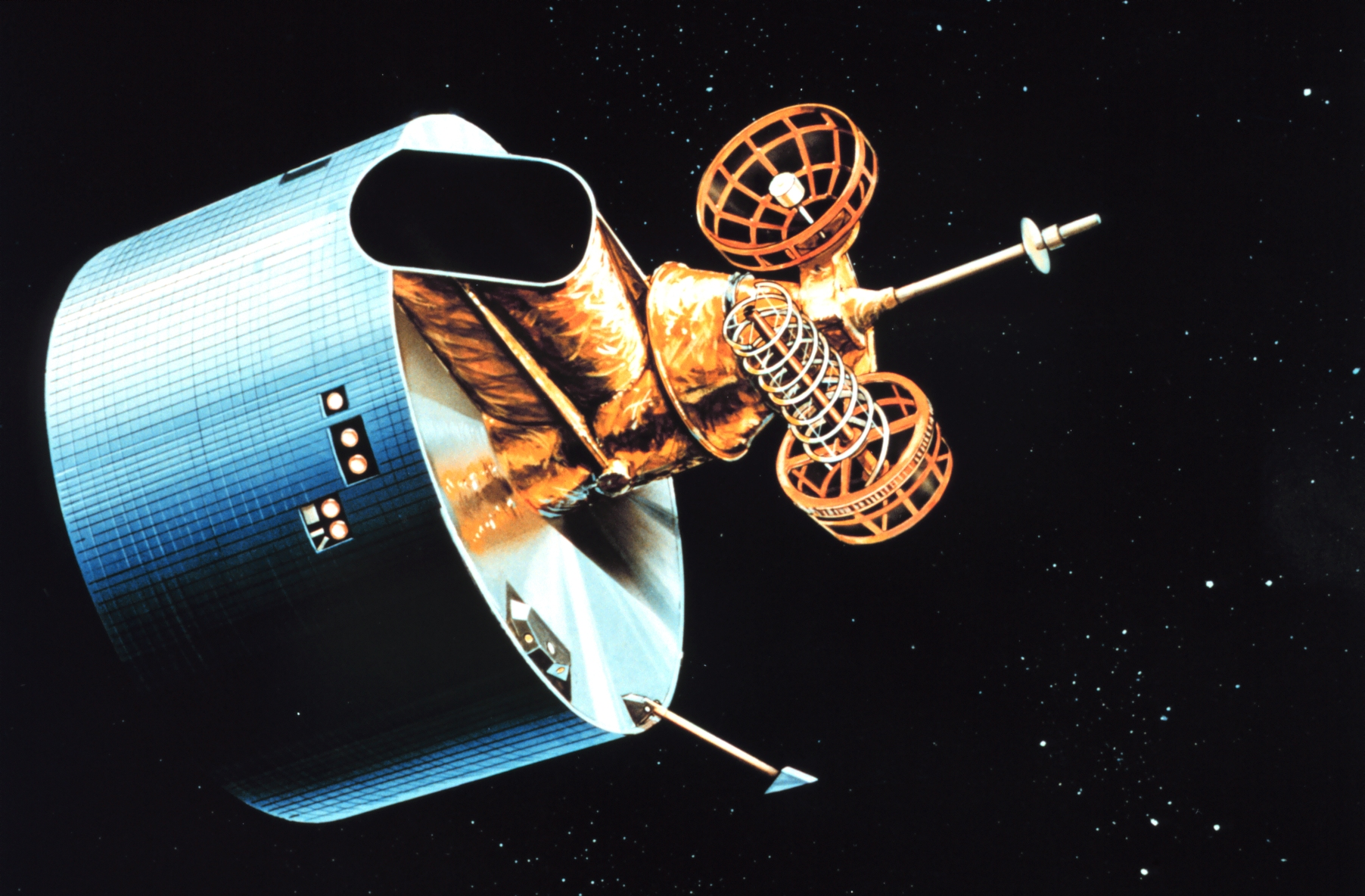
- Artist's impression of an HS-371-derived GOES satellite
- Mission type: Weather satellite
- Operator: NOAA / NASA
- Mission duration: 71 seconds 7 years (Planned)

Spacecraft properties
- Bus: HS-371
- Manufacturer: Hughes
- Launch mass: 660 kilograms (1,460 lb)

Start of mission
- Launch date: 3 May 1986, 22:18:00 UTC
- Rocket: Delta 3914 D178
- Launch site: Cape Canaveral LC-17A
- Contractor: McDonnell Douglas

End of mission
- Disposal: Remotely terminated by Range safety.
- Destroyed: 3 May 1986, 22:19:11 UTC
- Geostationary Operational Weather Satellite

GOES-G was a weather satellite to be operated by the National Oceanic and Atmospheric Administration. The satellite was designed to sense and monitor meteorological conditions from a geostationary orbit, intended to replace GOES-5 and provide continuous vertical profiles of atmospheric temperature and moisture. It was lost due to the launch failure of a Delta 3914 rocket on 3 May 1986.

== Launch ==
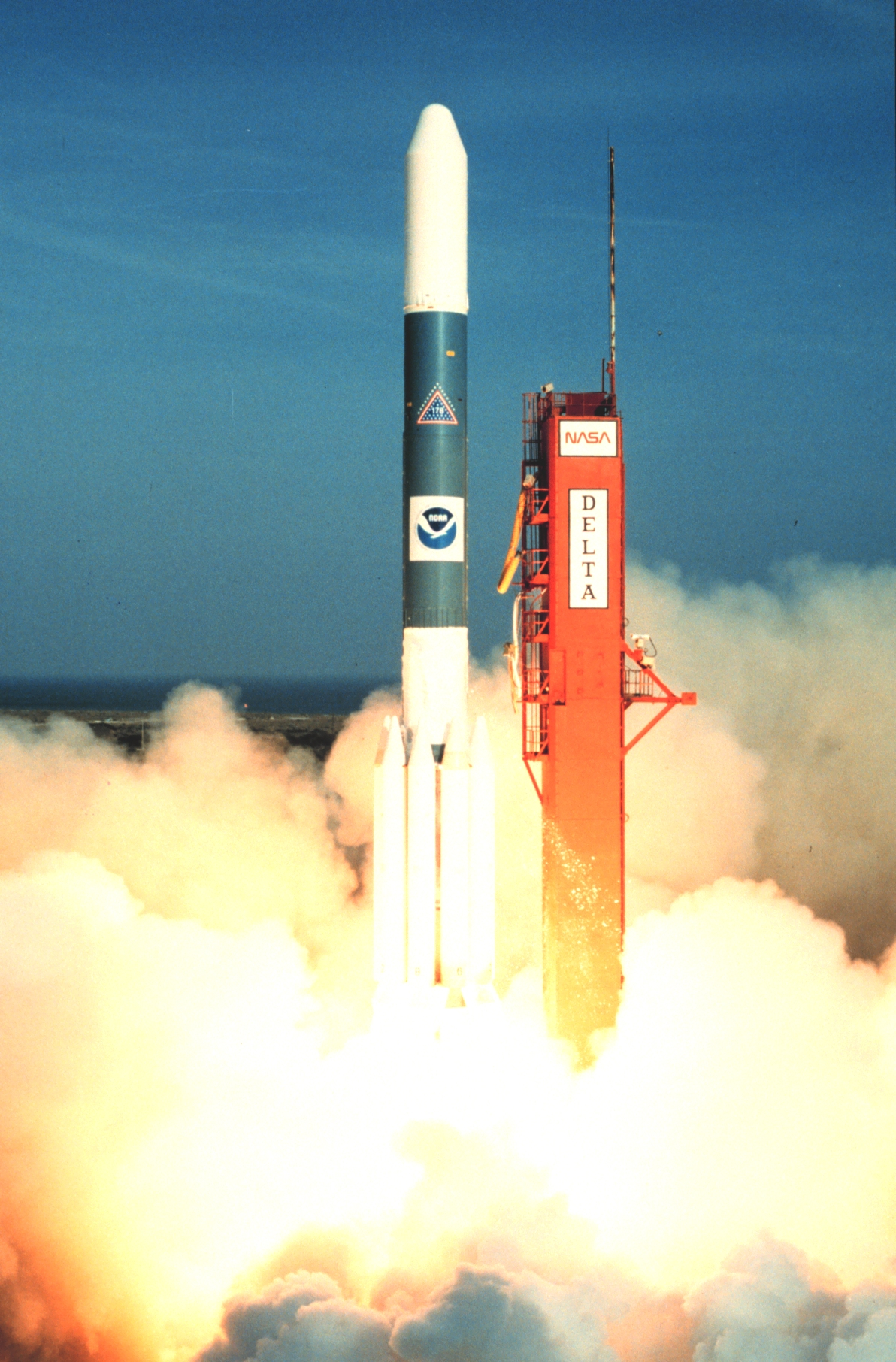
GOES-G launch.

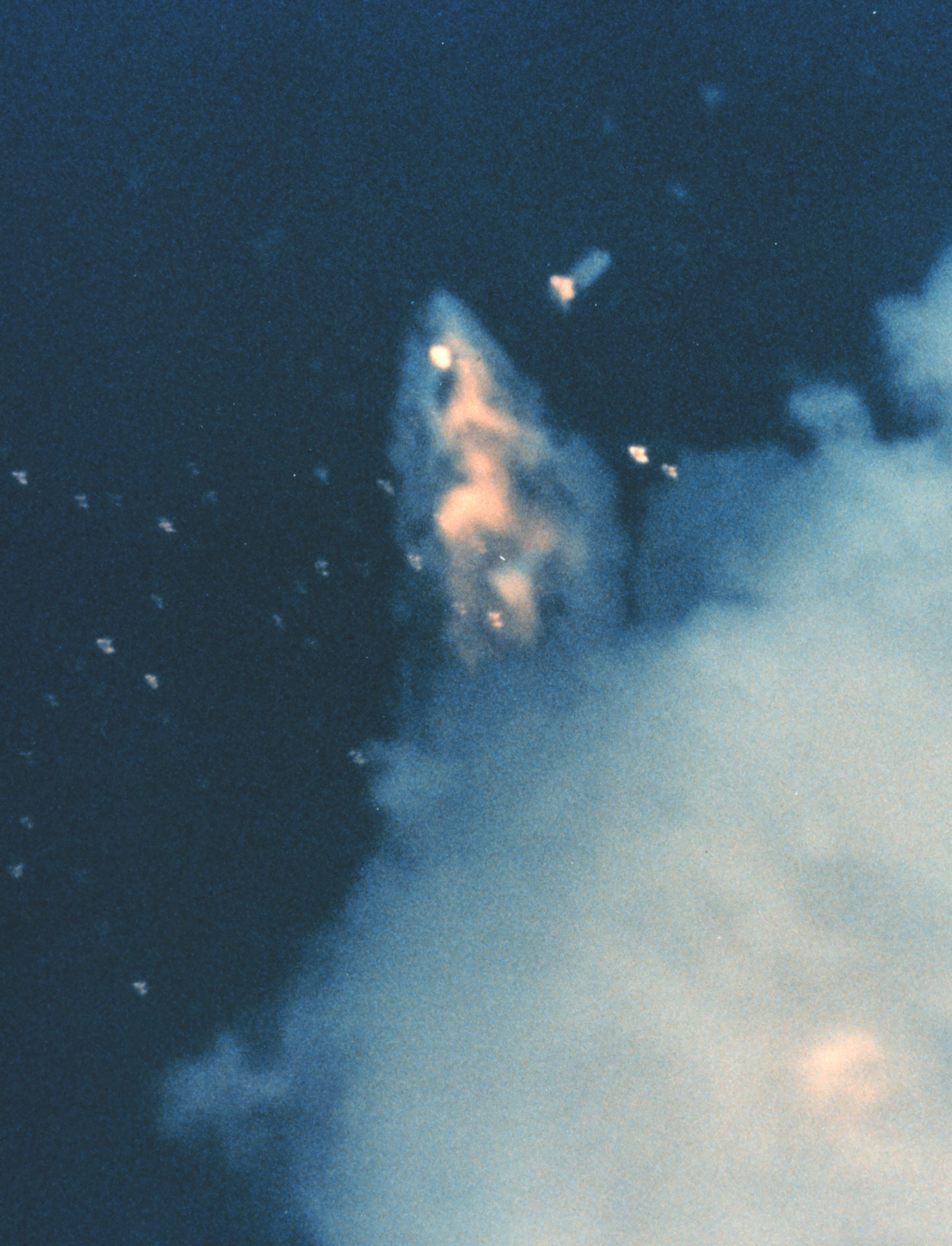
Explosion 71 seconds after launch.

Launch occurred on May 3, 1986 at 22:18 GMT, aboard Delta 178, the first NASA launch following the Challenger disaster. Seventy-one seconds into the flight, the first stage RS-27 engine shut down prematurely due to an electrical fault, and the rocket was destroyed by range safety.
