= LMDE =

LMDE may refer to:

- Linux Mint Debian Edition
- Lunar module descent engine
