= Kosmos 745 =

Soviet radar calibration target satellite

- Mission type: ABM radar target
- COSPAR ID: 1975-058A
- SATCAT no.: 07982

Spacecraft properties
- Spacecraft type: DS-P1-Yu
- Manufacturer: Yuzhnoye
- Launch mass: 400 kilograms (880 lb)

Start of mission
- Launch date: 24 June 1975, 12:05 UTC
- Rocket: Kosmos-2I 63SM
- Launch site: Plesetsk 133/1

End of mission
- Decay date: 12 March 1976

Orbital parameters
- Reference system: Geocentric
- Regime: Low Earth
- Perigee altitude: 260 kilometres (160 mi)
- Apogee altitude: 499 kilometres (310 mi)
- Inclination: 70.9 degrees
- Period: 92.1 minutes

Kosmos 745 (Russian: Космос 745 meaning Cosmos 745), also known as DS-P1-Yu No.76, was a Soviet satellite which was launched in 1975 as part of the Dnepropetrovsk Sputnik programme. It was a 400-kilogram (880 lb) spacecraft, which was built by the Yuzhnoye Design Bureau, and was used as a radar calibration target for anti-ballistic missile tests.

A Kosmos-2I 63SM carrier rocket was used to launch Kosmos 745 from Site 133/1 of the Plesetsk Cosmodrome. The launch occurred at 12:05 UTC on 24 June 1975, and resulted in the successfully insertion of the satellite into low Earth orbit. Upon reaching orbit, the satellite was assigned its Kosmos designation, and received the International Designator 1975-058A. The North American Aerospace Defense Command assigned it the catalogue number 07982.

Kosmos 745 was the seventy-seventh of seventy nine DS-P1-Yu satellites to be launched, and the seventieth of seventy two to successfully reach orbit. It was operated in an orbit with a perigee of 260 kilometres (160 mi), an apogee of 499 kilometres (310 mi), 70.9 degrees of inclination, and an orbital period of 92.1 minutes. It remained in orbit until it decayed and reentered the atmosphere on 12 March 1976.

== See also ==
- 1975 in spaceflight
