= Descent propulsion system =

Apollo Lunar Module rocket engine

Descent propulsion system (DPS)
- Country of origin: United States
- Date: 1964–1972
- Designer: Gerard W. Elverum Jr.
- Manufacturer: TRW
- Application: Lunar descent stage propulsion
- Predecessor: None
- Successor: TR-201
- Status: Retired

Liquid-fuel engine
- Propellant: N_{2}O_{4} / Aerozine 50
- Mixture ratio: 1.6
- Cycle: Pressure-fed
- Pumps: None

Configuration
- Chamber: 1
- Nozzle ratio: 47.5 (Apollo 14 and before); 53.6 (Apollo 15 and later)

Performance
- Thrust, vacuum: 10,500 lbf (47 kN) maximum, throttleable between 1,050 and 6,825 lbf (4.67–30.36 kN)
- Throttle range: 10%–60%, full thrust
- Thrust-to-weight ratio: 25.7 (weight on Earth)
- Chamber pressure: 110 psi (760 kPa) (100% thrust); 11 psi (76 kPa) (10% thrust)
- Specific impulse, vacuum: 311 s (3.05 km/s) (at full thrust); 285 s (2.79 km/s) (10% thrust)
- Burn time: 1030 seconds
- Restarts: Designed for two restarts, tested up to four times on Apollo 9
- Gimbal range: 6° pitch and yaw

Dimensions
- Length: 85.0 in (2.16 m) (Apollo 14 and earlier); 100.0 in (2.54 m) (Apollo 15 and later)
- Diameter: 59.0 in (1.50 m) (Apollo 14 and earlier); 63.0 in (1.60 m) (Apollo 15 and later)
- Dry mass: 394 lb (179 kg)

Used in
- Apollo Lunar Module as descent engine

The descent propulsion system (DPS /ˈdɪps/), or lunar module descent engine (LMDE), internal designation VTR-10, is a variable-throttle hypergolic rocket engine invented by Gerard W. Elverum Jr. and developed by Space Technology Laboratories (TRW) for use in the Apollo Lunar Module descent stage. It used Aerozine 50 fuel and dinitrogen tetroxide (N_{2}O_{4}) oxidizer. This engine used a pintle injector, which paved the way for other engines to use similar designs.

== Requirements ==
The propulsion system for the descent stage of the lunar module was designed to transfer the vehicle, containing two crewmen, from a 60-nautical-mile (110 km) circular lunar parking orbit to an elliptical descent orbit with a pericynthion of 50,000 feet (15,000 m), then provide a powered descent to the lunar surface, with hover time above the lunar surface to select the exact landing site. To accomplish these maneuvers, a propulsion system was developed that used hypergolic propellants and a gimballed pressure-fed ablative cooled engine that was capable of being throttled. A lightweight cryogenic helium pressurization system was also used. The exhaust nozzle extension was designed to crush without damaging the LM if it struck the surface, which happened on Apollo 15.

== Development ==
According to NASA history publication Chariots for Apollo, "The lunar module descent engine probably was the biggest challenge and the most outstanding technical development of Apollo." A requirement for a throttleable engine was new for crewed spacecraft. Very little advanced research had been done in variable-thrust rocket engines up to that point. Rocketdyne proposed a pressure-fed engine using the injection of inert helium gas into the propellant flow to achieve thrust reduction at a constant propellant flow rate. While NASA's Manned Spacecraft Center (MSC) judged this approach to be plausible, it represented a considerable advance in the state of the art. (In fact, accidental ingestion of helium pressurant proved to be a problem on AS-201, the first flight of the Apollo Service Module engine in February 1966.) Therefore, MSC directed Grumman to conduct a parallel development program of competing designs.

Grumman held a bidders' conference on March 14, 1963, attended by Aerojet General, Reaction Motors Division of Thiokol, United Technology Center Division of United Aircraft, and Space Technology Laboratories, Inc. (STL). In May, STL was selected as the competitor to Rocketdyne's concept. STL proposed an engine that was gimbaled as well as throttleable, using flow control valves and a variable-area pintle injector, in much the same manner as does a shower head, to regulate pressure, rate of propellant flow, and the pattern of fuel mixture in the combustion chamber.

The first full-throttle firing of Space Technology Laboratories' LM descent engine was carried out in early 1964. NASA planners expected one of the two drastically different designs would emerge the clear winner, but this did not happen throughout 1964. Apollo Spacecraft Program Office manager Joseph Shea formed a committee of NASA, Grumman and Air Force propulsion experts, chaired by American spacecraft designer Maxime Faget, in November 1964 to recommend a choice, but their results were inconclusive. Grumman chose Rocketdyne on January 5, 1965. Still not satisfied, MSC Director Robert R. Gilruth convened his own five-member board, also chaired by Faget, which reversed Grumman's decision on January 18 and awarded the contract to STL.

To keep the DPS as simple, lightweight, and reliable as possible, the propellants were pressure-fed with helium gas instead of using heavy, complicated, and failure-prone turbopumps. Cryogenic liquid helium was loaded into the tank before liftoff and the tank sealed. Heat leak through the tank insulation warmed the liquid until it became supercritical helium. The helium warmed over time, increasing the tank pressure. The helium was pressure regulated down to 246 psi (1.70 MPa) for the propellant tanks. This allowed a sufficient inventory of pressurant gas to be stored in a relatively small volume, with a much lighter tank than would have been required to store the helium as a room temperature gas. The system was also equipped with a burst disk assembly that relieved the pressure when pre-set pressure (1,881 to 1,967 psi [12.97 to 13.56 MPa]) was reached, allowing the gas to vent harmlessly into space. Once the helium was gone however, DPS operation would be limited due to inability to maintain system pressure as the propellant was expelled from the tanks. This was not seen as an issue, since normally the helium release would not occur until after the lunar module was on the Moon, by which time the DPS had completed its operational life and would never be fired again.

The design and development of the innovative thrust chamber and pintle design is credited to TRW Aerospace Engineer Gerard W. Elverum Jr. The engine could throttle between 1,050 and 10,125 pounds-force (4.67–45.04 kN) but operation between 65% and 92.5% thrust was avoided to prevent excessive nozzle erosion. It weighed 394 pounds (179 kg), with a length of 90.5 inches (230 cm) and diameter of 59.0 inches (150 cm).

== Performance in LM "life boat" ==
The LMDE achieved a prominent role in the Apollo 13 mission, serving as the primary propulsion engine after the oxygen tank explosion in the Apollo Service Module. After this event, the ground controllers decided that the Service Propulsion System could no longer be operated safely, leaving the DPS engine in Aquarius as the only means of maneuvering Apollo 13.

== Modification for Extended Lunar Module ==
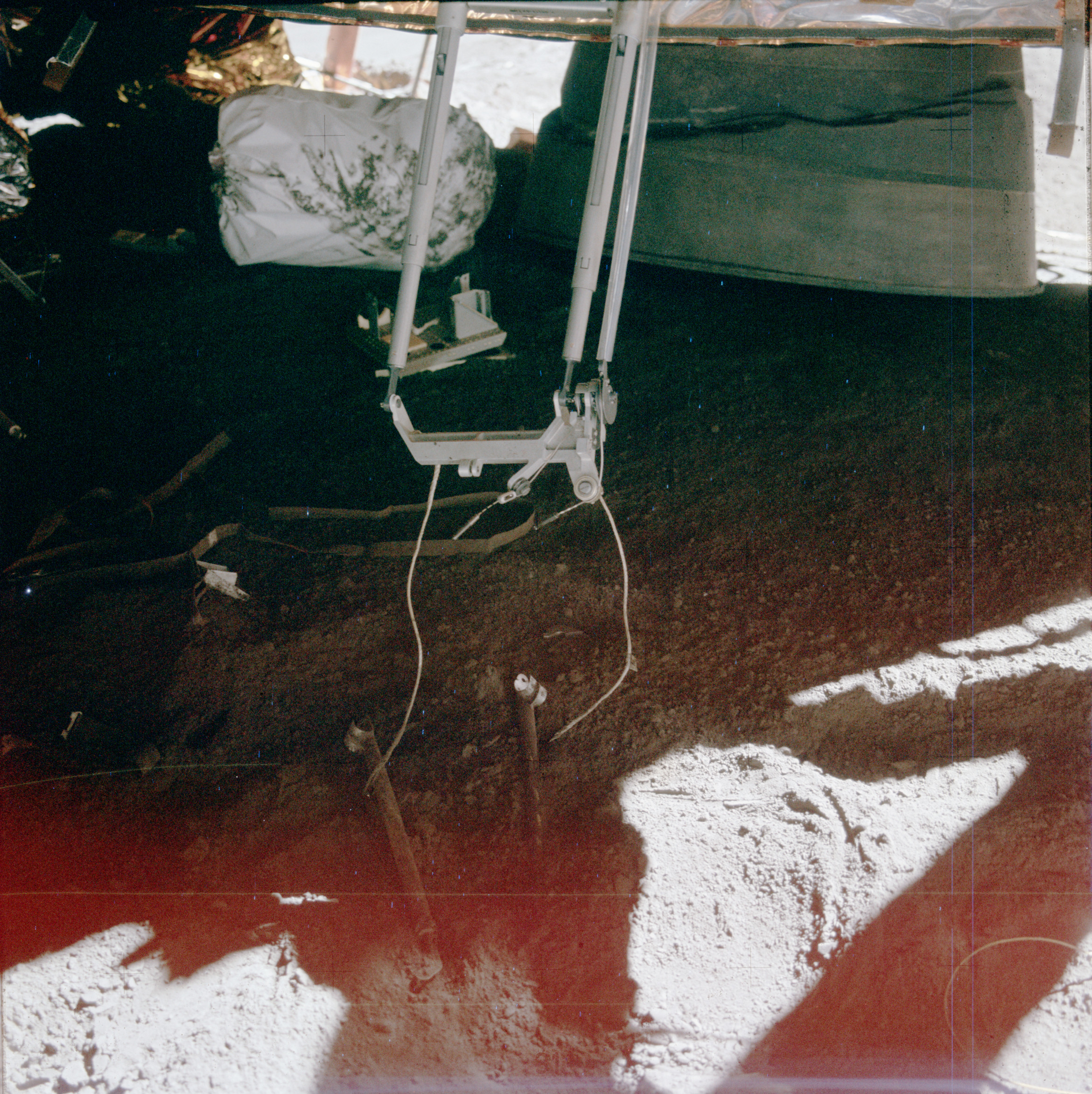
Decreased clearance led to buckling of the extended descent engine nozzle on the landing of Apollo 15 (upper right).

In order to extend landing payload weight and lunar surface stay times, the last three Apollo Lunar Modules were upgraded by adding a 10-inch (25 cm) nozzle extension to the engine to increase thrust. The nozzle exhaust bell, like the original, was designed to crush if it hit the surface. It never had on the first three landings, but did buckle on the first Extended landing, Apollo 15.

== TR-201 in Delta second stage ==
After the Apollo program, the DPS was further developed into the TRW TR-201 engine. This engine was used in the second stage, referred to as Delta-P, of the Delta launch vehicle (Delta 1000, Delta 2000, Delta 3000 series) for 77 successful launches between 1972–1988.
