= GOES 2 =

NOAA weather satellite

GOES-2
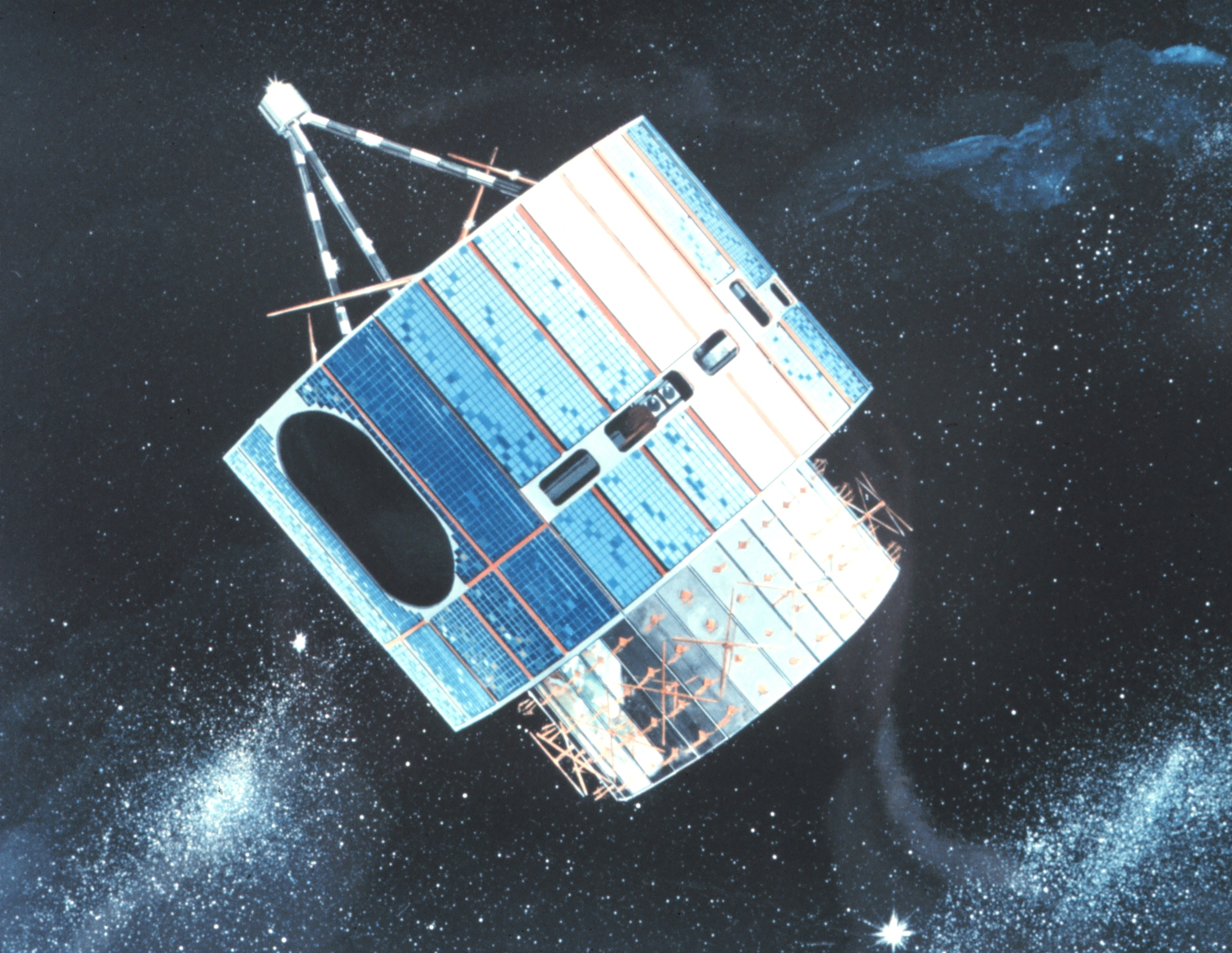
- Artist's impression of an SMS-series GOES satellite in orbit
- Mission type: Weather satellite
- Operator: NOAA / NASA
- COSPAR ID: 1977-048A
- SATCAT no.: 10061
- Mission duration: 24 years

Spacecraft properties
- Spacecraft type: SMS
- Manufacturer: Ford Aerospace
- Launch mass: 295 kilograms (650 lb)

Start of mission
- Launch date: 16 June 1977, 10:51:00 UTC
- Rocket: Delta 2914
- Launch site: Cape Canaveral LC-17B
- Contractor: McDonnell Douglas

End of mission
- Disposal: Placed in a Graveyard orbit and Decommissioned
- Deactivated: 5 May 2001, 21:08 UTC

Orbital parameters
- Reference system: Geocentric
- Regime: Geostationary
- Longitude: 75° West (1977-1978); 100-110° West (1978-1984); 112-114° West (1984-1990); 60° West (1990-1992); 135° West (1992-1995); 177° West (1995-2001)
- Perigee altitude: 35,972 kilometres (22,352 mi)
- Apogee altitude: 36,094 kilometres (22,428 mi)
- Inclination: 13.7696º
- Period: 24 hours
- Epoch: 17 May 2016, 10:12:31 UTC
- Geostationary Operational Environmental Satellite (Synchronous Meteorological Satellite Derived)

GOES-2, known as GOES-B before becoming operational, was a geostationary weather satellite which was operated by the United States National Oceanic and Atmospheric Administration as part of the Geostationary Operational Environmental Satellite system. GOES-2 was built by Ford Aerospace, and was based on the satellite bus developed for the Synchronous Meteorological Satellite programme. At launch it had a mass of 295 kilograms (650 lb). It was positioned in geostationary orbit, from where it was used for weather forecasting in the United States. Following its retirement as a weather satellite, it was used as a communications satellite until its final decommissioning in 2001.

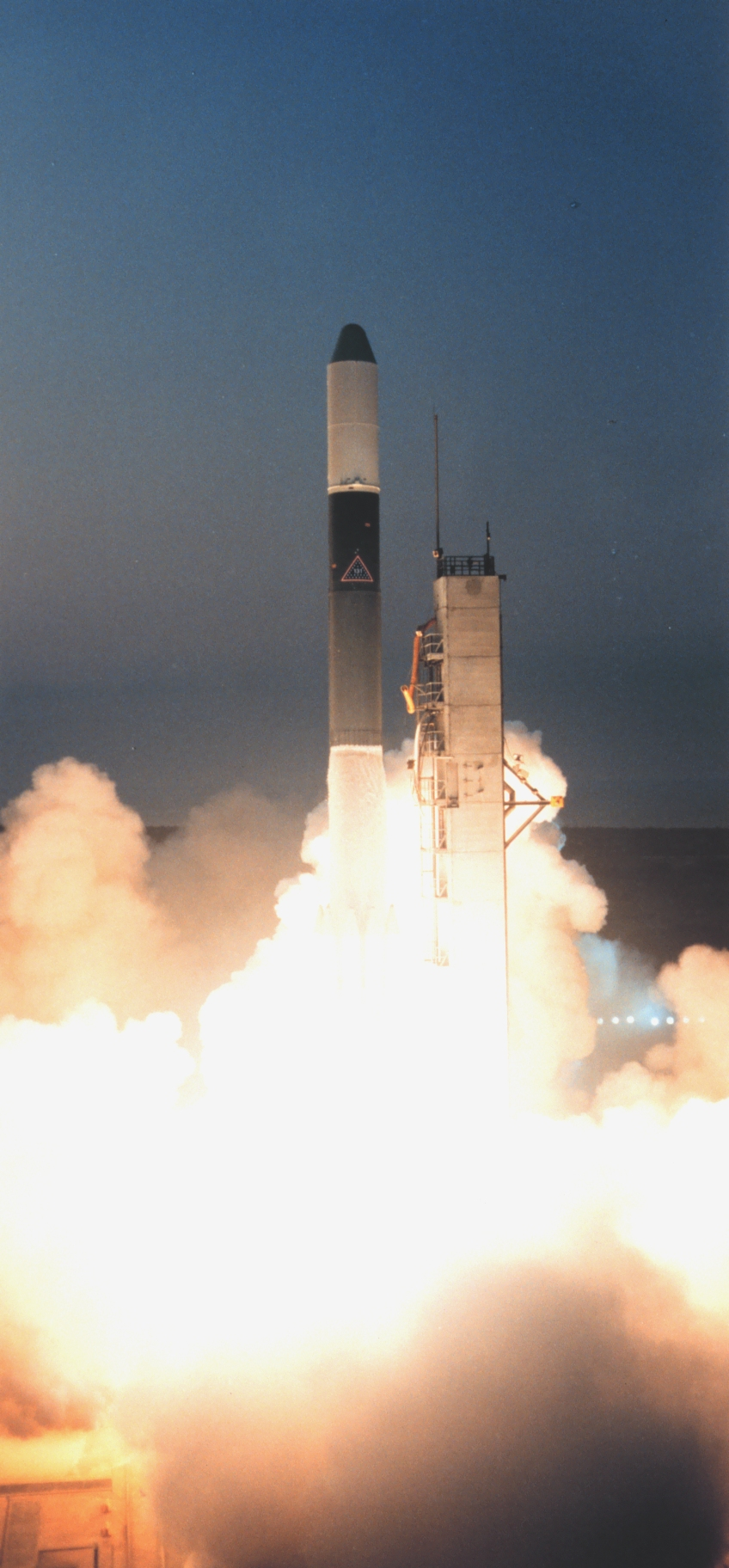
Launch of GOES-B on a Delta 2914

GOES-B was launched using a Delta 2914 carrier rocket flying from Launch Complex 17B at the Cape Canaveral Air Force Station. The launch occurred at 10:51:00 GMT on 16 June 1977. The launch successfully placed GOES-B into a geostationary transfer orbit, from which it raised itself to geostationary orbit by means of an onboard SVM-5 apogee motor. Its insertion into geosynchronous orbit occurred at 03:26 GMT on 17 June.

Following on-orbit testing, GOES-B was redesignated GOES-2, and replaced SMS-1 at a longitude of 60 degrees west. It was operated as a weather satellite at several different positions until 1993, and was then placed into storage. It was reactivated as a communications satellite in 1995, and moved to 177° West. It was used by Peacesat to provide communications services to islands in the Pacific Ocean, a role in which it was replaced by GOES 7 in 1999, and by the US National Science Foundation for communications with the Amundsen–Scott South Pole Station. On 5 May 2001, it was retired to a graveyard orbit. At 21:08 GMT, two hours after the last manoeuvre to remove it from geosynchronous orbit, GOES-2 was commanded to deactivate its communications system, preventing future ground commands being sent to it.

== See also ==
- 1977 in spaceflight
- TDRS-1
