= Kosmos 725 =

Soviet radar calibration target satellite

- Mission type: ABM radar target
- COSPAR ID: 1975-026A
- SATCAT no.: 07730

Spacecraft properties
- Spacecraft type: DS-P1-Yu
- Manufacturer: Yuzhnoye
- Launch mass: 400 kilograms (880 lb)

Start of mission
- Launch date: 8 April 1975, 18:29:56 UTC
- Rocket: Kosmos-2I 63SM
- Launch site: Plesetsk 133/1

End of mission
- Decay date: 6 January 1976

Orbital parameters
- Reference system: Geocentric
- Regime: Low Earth
- Perigee altitude: 267 kilometres (166 mi)
- Apogee altitude: 466 kilometres (290 mi)
- Inclination: 70.9 degrees
- Period: 91.9 minutes

Kosmos 725 (Russian: Космос 725 meaning Cosmos 725), also known as DS-P1-Yu No.77, was a Soviet satellite which was launched in 1975 as part of the Dnepropetrovsk Sputnik programme. It was a 400-kilogram (880 lb) spacecraft, which was built by the Yuzhnoye Design Bureau, and was used as a radar calibration target for anti-ballistic missile tests.

A Kosmos-2I 63SM carrier rocket was used to launch Kosmos 725 from Site 133/1 of the Plesetsk Cosmodrome. The launch occurred at 18:29:56 UTC on 8 April 1975, and resulted in the successfully insertion of the satellite into low Earth orbit. Upon reaching orbit, the satellite was assigned its Kosmos designation, and received the International Designator 1975-026A. The North American Aerospace Defense Command assigned it the catalogue number 07730.

Kosmos 725 was the seventy-sixth of seventy nine DS-P1-Yu satellites to be launched, and the sixty-ninth of seventy two to successfully reach orbit. It was operated in an orbit with a perigee of 267 kilometres (166 mi), an apogee of 466 kilometres (290 mi), 70.9 degrees of inclination, and an orbital period of 91.9 minutes. It remained in orbit until it decayed and reentered the atmosphere on 6 January 1976.

== See also ==
- 1975 in spaceflight
