= Delta-P =

American liquid-propellant rocket stage

- Manufacturer: TRW and McDonnell Douglas
- Country of origin: United States
- Used on: Delta 1000; Delta 2000; Delta 3000

General characteristics
- Height: 5.9 m (19 ft)
- Diameter: 2.4 m (7.9 ft)
- Gross mass: 6,954 kg (15,331 lb)

Engine details
- Powered by: 1 TR-201
- Maximum thrust: 43.63 kN (9,810 lbf)
- Specific impulse: 319 seconds (3.13 km/s)
- Burn time: 431 seconds
- Propellant: Aerozine 50 / N_{2}O_{4}

The Delta-P is an American rocket stage, developed by McDonnell Douglas and TRW, first used on November 10, 1972 as the second stage for the Delta 1000 series. It continued to serve as the second stage for subsequent Delta 2000 and Delta 3000 flights for 17 years, with its last usage on February 8, 1988. It is propelled by a single TRW TR-201 rocket engine, fueled by Aerozine 50 and dinitrogen tetroxide, which are hypergolic.

The Delta-P traces its heritage to the Apollo Lunar Module's Descent Propulsion System. The TR-201 engine is the Descent Propulsion System modified to be a fixed thrust engine. The Descent Propulsion System was first fired in flight during the Apollo 5 mission, in a low Earth orbit test on January 22, 1968.

As the supply of these surplus Apollo engines was depleted, the Douglas/Aerojet Delta-K upper stage was introduced in the Delta 3000 program. The Delta-K was then exclusively used on the second stage for the Delta 4000, Delta 5000, and subsequent Delta II.
