= Synchronous Meteorological Satellite =

US weather satellite program

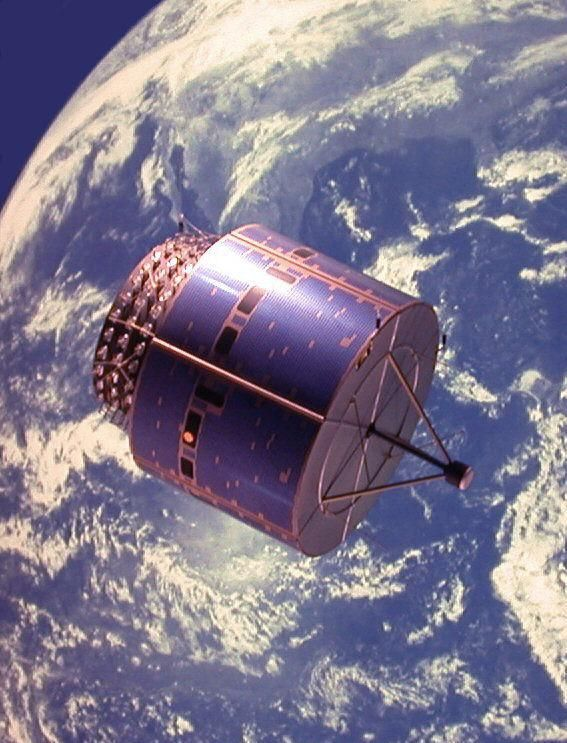
Illustration of a Synchronous Meteorological Satellite

The Synchronous Meteorological Satellite (SMS) program, was a program where NASA developed two weather satellites; which were placed into geosynchronous orbit.

== History ==
SMS-1 was launched May 17, 1974 and SMS-2 was launched February 6, 1975. Both satellites were carried to orbit by Delta 2914 rockets. The program was initiated after the successes achieved by the Applications Technology Satellite (ATS) research satellites, which demonstrated the feasibility of using satellites in geosynchronous orbit for meteorology. The Geostationary Operational Environmental Satellite (GOES) program, which now supports weather forecasting, severe storm tracking, and meteorology research in the United States, followed immediately after the SMS program; the GOES 1 satellite was initially designated SMS-C. SMS-1 and SMS-2; and GOES-1, GOES-2, and GOES-3; were essentially identical.

== List of SMS satellites ==
Designation		Launch Date/Time (UTC)	Rocket	Launch Site	Longitude	First Image	Status	Retirement	Remarks
Launch	Operational	Launch Date/Time (UTC)	Rocket	Launch Site	Longitude	First Image	Status	Retirement	Remarks
=== SMS series satellites ===
SMS-A	SMS-1	May 17, 1974	Delta 2914						
SMS-B	SMS-2	February 6, 1975	Delta 2914						
=== SMS-derived satellites ===
SMS-C; GOES-A	GOES 1	October 16, 1975, 22:40	Delta 2914	CCAFS LC-17A		October 25, 1975	Retired	March 7, 1985	
SMS-D; GOES-B	GOES 2	June 16, 1977, 10:51	Delta 2914	CCAFS LC-17B	60°W		Retired	1993	Reactivated as comsat in 1995, finally deactivated in May 2001
SMS-E; GOES-C	GOES 3	June 16, 1978, 10:49	Delta 2914	CCAFS LC-17B			Retired	1993	Reactivated as comsat in 1995, was decommissioned 29 June 2016
