= Kosmos 703 =

Soviet radar calibration satellite

- Mission type: ABM radar target
- COSPAR ID: 1975-003A
- SATCAT no.: 07611

Spacecraft properties
- Spacecraft type: DS-P1-Yu
- Manufacturer: Yuzhnoye
- Launch mass: 400 kilograms (880 lb)

Start of mission
- Launch date: 21 January 1975, 11:04:57 UTC
- Rocket: Kosmos-2I 63SM
- Launch site: Plesetsk 133/1

End of mission
- Decay date: 20 November 1975

Orbital parameters
- Reference system: Geocentric
- Regime: Low Earth
- Perigee altitude: 197 kilometres (122 mi)
- Apogee altitude: 1,430 kilometres (890 mi)
- Inclination: 81.9 degrees
- Period: 101.2 minutes

Kosmos 703 (Russian: Космос 703 meaning Cosmos 703), also known as DS-P1-Yu No.70, was a Soviet satellite which was launched in 1975 as part of the Dnepropetrovsk Sputnik programme. It was a 400-kilogram (880 lb) spacecraft, which was built by the Yuzhnoye Design Bureau, and was used as a radar calibration target for anti-ballistic missile tests.

A Kosmos-2I 63SM carrier rocket was used to launch Kosmos 703 from Site 133/1 of the Plesetsk Cosmodrome. The launch occurred at 11:04:57 UTC on 21 January 1975, and resulted in the satellite successfully reaching low Earth orbit. Upon reaching orbit, the satellite was assigned its Kosmos designation, and received the International Designator 1975-003A. The North American Aerospace Defense Command assigned it the catalogue number 07611.

Kosmos 703 was the seventy-fourth of seventy nine DS-P1-Yu satellites to be launched, and the sixty-seventh of seventy two to successfully reach orbit. It was operated in an orbit with a perigee of 197 kilometres (122 mi), an apogee of 1,430 kilometres (890 mi), 81.9 degrees of inclination, and an orbital period of 101.2 minutes. It remained in orbit until it decayed and reentered the atmosphere on 20 November 1975.

== See also ==
- 1975 in spaceflight
