= GOES 1 =

NOAA weather satellite

GOES-1
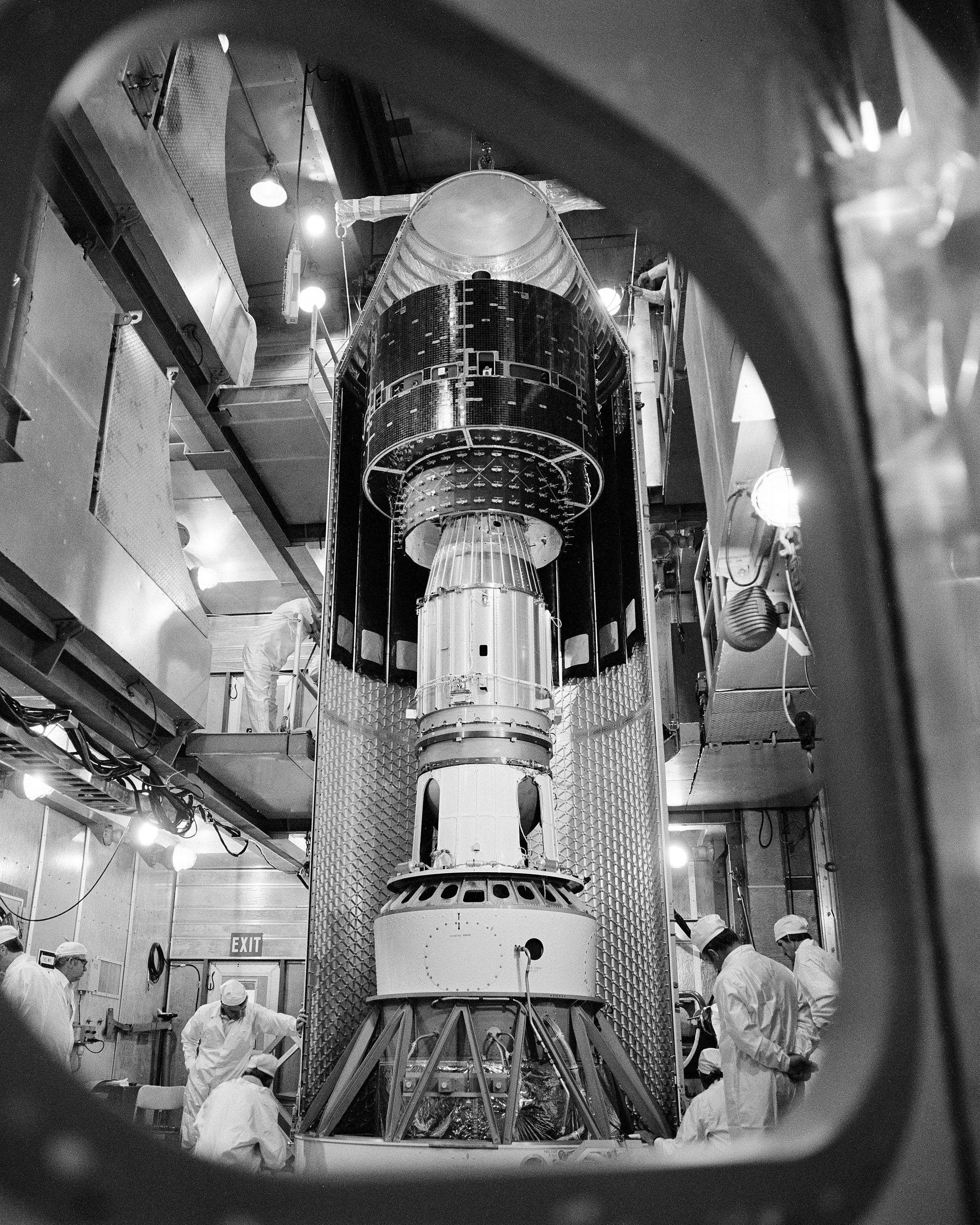
- GOES-1 is prepared for launch atop its Delta 2914 rocket.
- Names: GOES-A; SMS-C
- Mission type: Weather satellite
- Operator: NASA / NOAA
- COSPAR ID: 1975-100A
- SATCAT no.: 8366
- Mission duration: 9 years, 4 months and 18 days

Spacecraft properties
- Spacecraft type: SMS
- Manufacturer: Ford Aerospace
- Launch mass: 631 kg
- Dimensions: 190.5 cm (diameter) and 230 cm (length)

Start of mission
- Launch date: 16 October 1975, 22:40:00 UTC
- Rocket: Delta 2914
- Launch site: Cape Canaveral, LC-17B
- Contractor: McDonnell Douglas
- Entered service: 25 October 1975 (first image)

End of mission
- Disposal: Decommissioned
- Deactivated: 7 March 1985

Orbital parameters
- Reference system: Geocentric orbit
- Regime: Geostationary orbit
- Slot: Indian Ocean
- Geostationary Operational Environmental Satellite

GOES-1, designated GOES-A and SMS-C prior to entering service, was a weather satellite, developed by the NASA, operated by the United States National Oceanic and Atmospheric Administration (NOAA). It was the first Geostationary Operational Environmental Satellite (GOES) to be launched.

== Launch ==
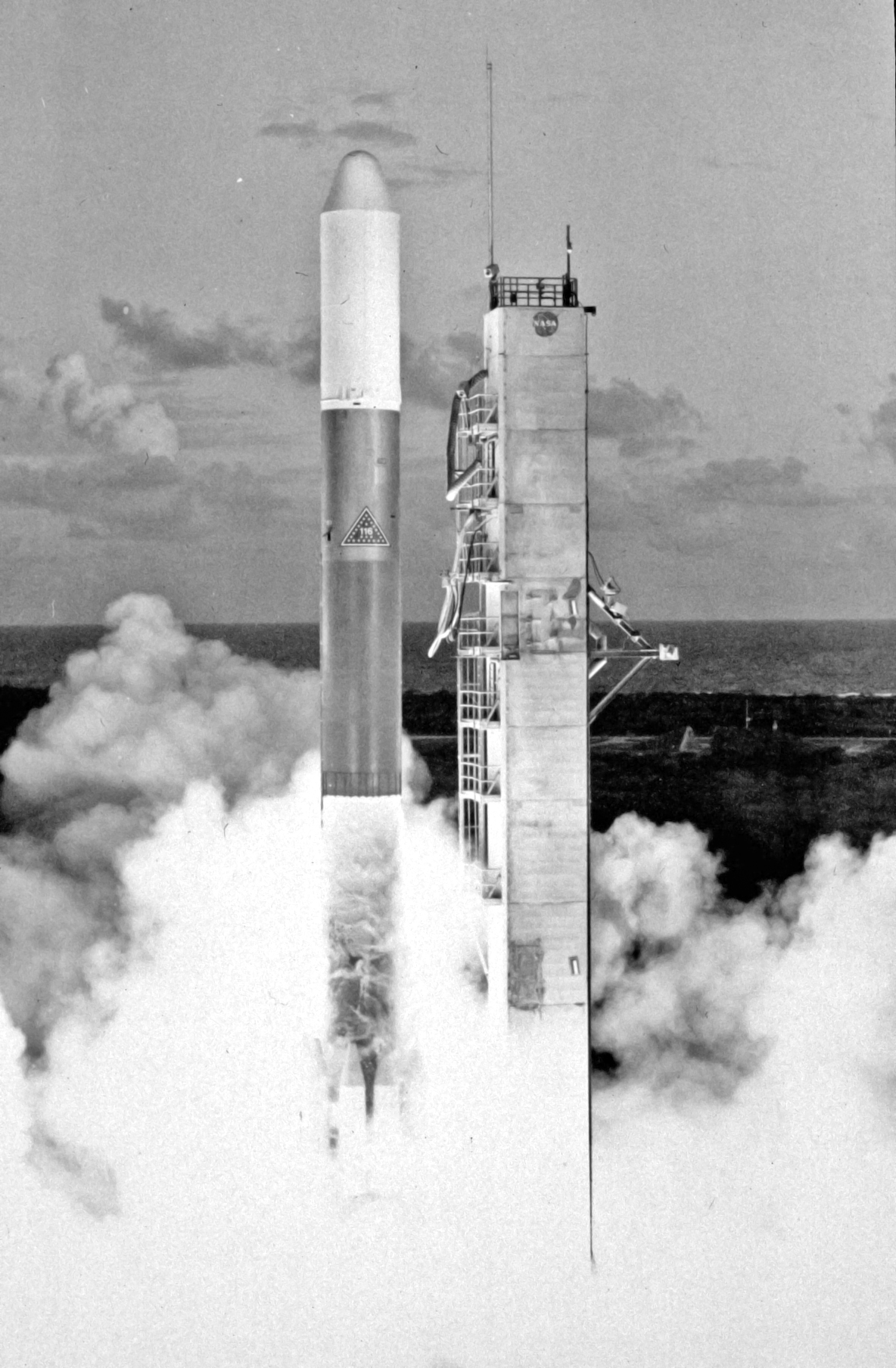
GOES-A lifts off aboard Delta 2914 D116.

GOES-A was launched atop a Delta 2914 from LC-17B at the Cape Canaveral Air Force Station. The launch occurred at 22:40:00 UTC on 16 October 1975, and left the satellite in a geostationary transfer orbit. Following launch, it raised itself to a geostationary orbit by means of its onboard SVM-5 apogee motor, at which time it was redesignated GOES-1.

== Operations ==
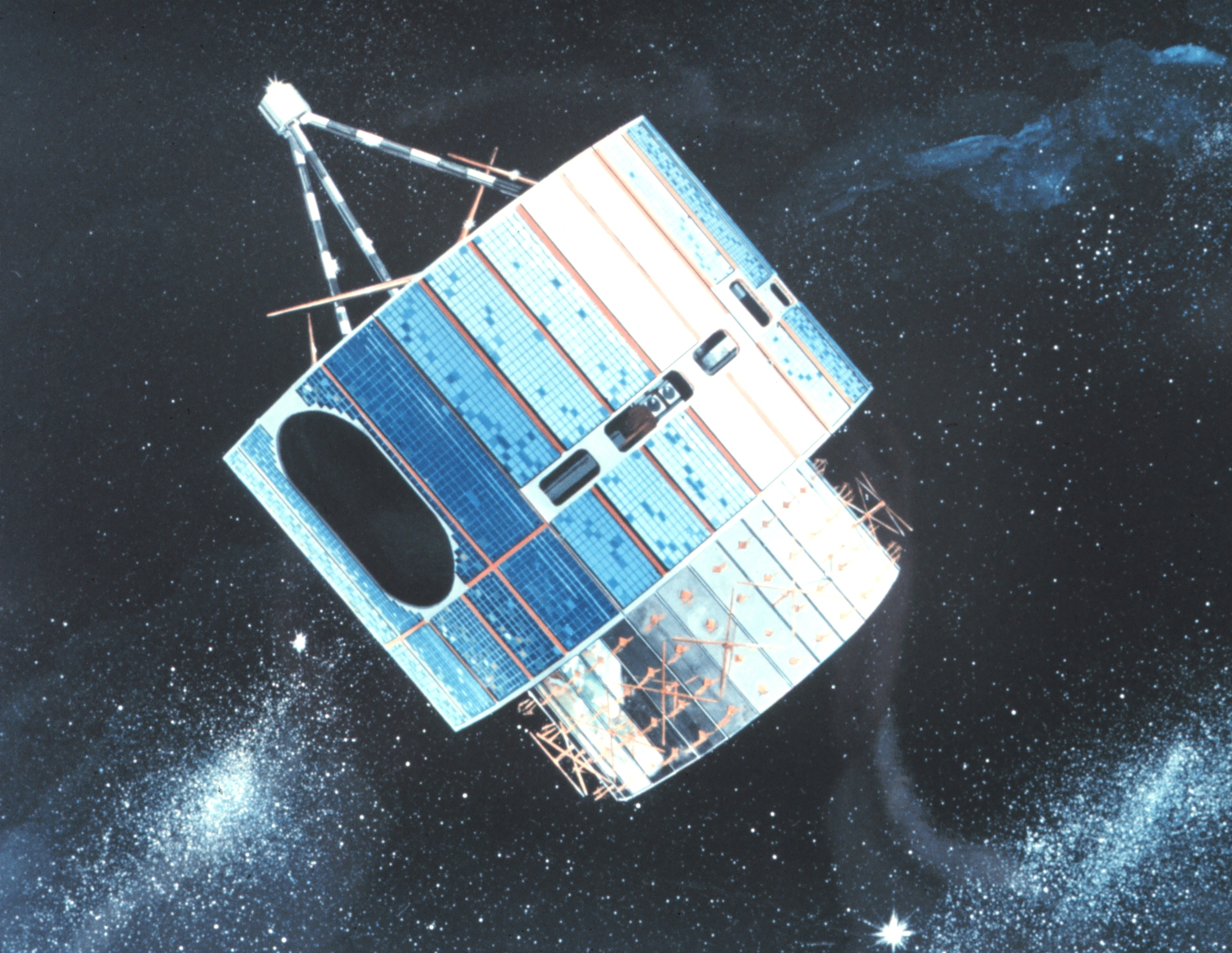
Artist's impression of GOES-1 in orbit

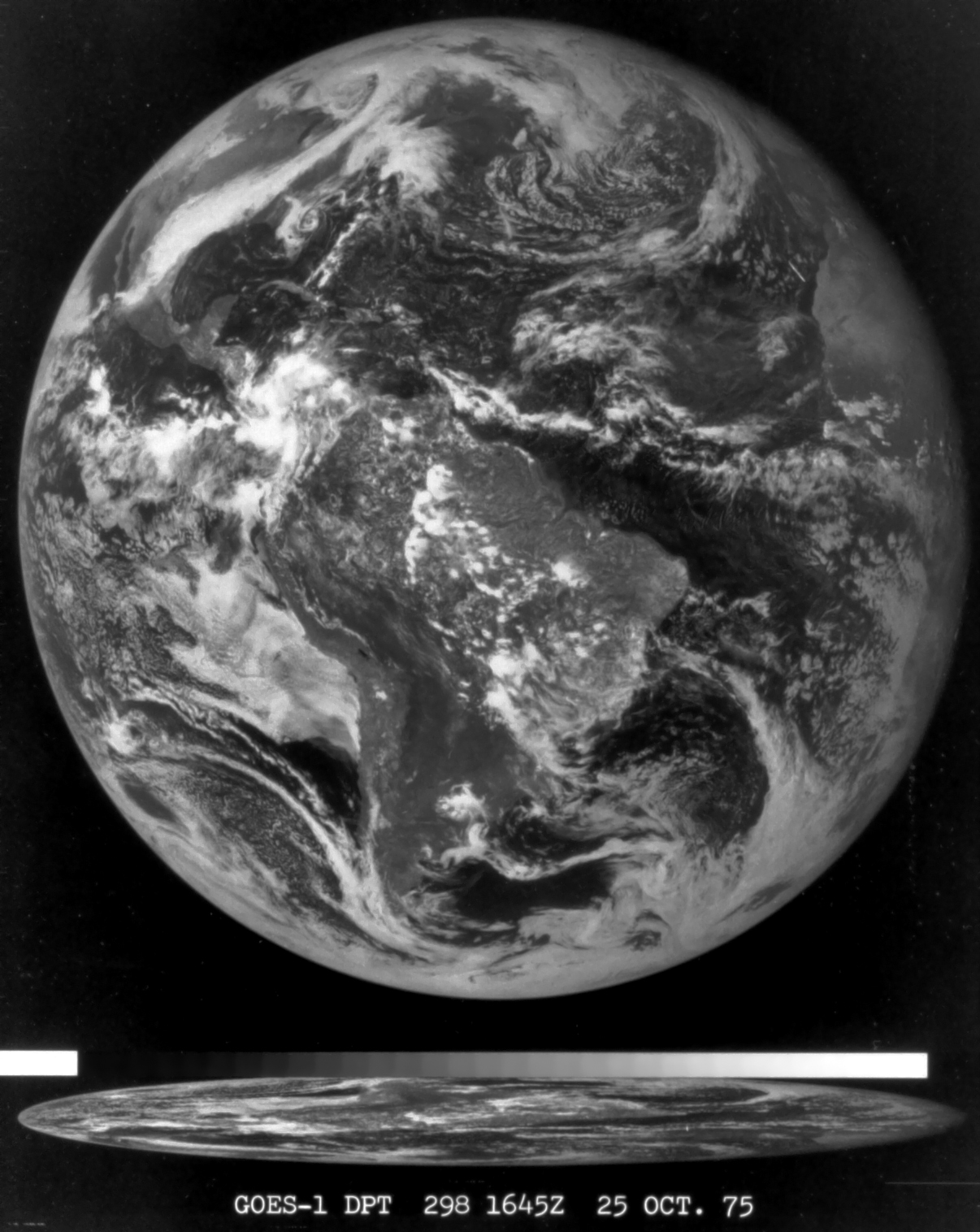
The first image obtained from the GOES-1 satellite, 25 October 1975, 1645 UTC whilst the spacecraft was moving to its operational orbit above the indian ocean.

It was positioned over the Indian Ocean to gather data for the Global Atmospheric Research Program (GARP). GOES-1 was equipped with a Visible Infrared Spin-Scan Radiometer (VISSR), which provided day and night imagery of terrestrial cloud conditions. It returned its first image on 25 October 1975, nine days after launch. The satellite continuously monitored weather events and relayed this meteorological data from over 10,000 surface locations into a central processing center. The data was then incorporated into weather prediction models. It also carried a Space Environment Monitor (SEM) and a Data Collection System (DCS), derived from those used on TIROS satellites.

GOES-1 was replaced by GOES-3, which was launched in 1978. After finishing operations over the Indian Ocean, it was moved to replace SMS-2 over the Pacific Ocean. It remained operational there until 3 February 1985 and it was deactivated by NASA on 7 March 1985.

== See also ==
- Synchronous Meteorological Satellite (SMS-A, SMS-B)
