= TR-201 =

Rocket engine

- Country of origin: United States
- Date: 1972–1988
- Manufacturer: TRW
- Application: Upper stage
- Predecessor: LMDE
- Status: Retired

Liquid-fuel engine
- Propellant: N_{2}O_{4} / Aerozine 50
- Cycle: Pressure-fed engine

Configuration
- Chamber: 1

Performance
- Thrust, vacuum: 41.9 kN (9,400 lb_{f})
- Thrust-to-weight ratio: 31.4
- Chamber pressure: 700 kPa (100 psi)
- Specific impulse, vacuum: 301 s (2.95 km/s)

Dimensions
- Length: 2.27 m (7 ft 5 in)
- Diameter: 1.38 m (4 ft 6 in)
- Dry mass: 113 kg (249 lb)

Used in
- Delta-P, second stage of Delta (rocket family)

The TR-201 or TR201 is a hypergolic pressure-fed rocket engine used to propel the upper stage of the Delta rocket, referred to as Delta-P, from 1972 to 1988. The rocket engine uses Aerozine 50 as fuel, and N_{2}O_{4} as oxidizer. It was developed in the early 1970s by TRW as a derivative of the lunar module descent engine (LMDE). This engine used a pintle injector first invented by Gerard W. Elverum Jr. and developed by TRW in the late 1950s and received US Patent in 1972. This injector technology and design is also used on SpaceX Merlin engines.

The thrust chamber was initially developed for the Apollo Lunar Module and was subsequently adopted for the Delta expendable launch vehicle 2nd stage. The engine made 10 flights during the Apollo program and 77 during its Delta career between 1974 and 1988. The TRW TR-201 was re-configured as a fixed-thrust version of the LMDE for Delta's stage 2. Multi-start operation is adjustable up to 55.6 kN and propellant throughput up to 7,711 kg; and the engine can be adapted to optional expansion ratio nozzles. Development of the innovative thrust chamber and pintle design is credited to TRW Aerospace Engineer Gerard W. Elverum Jr.

The combustion chamber consists of an ablative-lined titanium alloy case to the 16:1 area ratio. Fabrication of the Ti6Al4V alloy titanium case was accomplished by machining the chamber portion and the exit cone portion from forgings and welding them into one unit at the throat centerline. The ablative liner is fabricated in two segments and installed from either end. The shape of the nozzle extension is such that the ablative liner is retained in the exit cone during transportation, launch and boost. During engine firing, thrust loads force the exit cone liner against the case. The titanium head end assembly which contains the Pintle Injector and propellant valve subcomponents is attached with 36 A-286 steel 1/4 inch (6.4 mm) bolts.

In order to keep the maximum operating temperatures of the titanium case in the vicinity of 800 °F (427 °C), the ablative liner was designed as a composite material providing the maximum heat sink and minimum weight. The selected configuration consisted of a high density, erosion-resistant silica cloth/phenolic material surrounded by a lightweight needle-felted silica mat/phenolic insulation.

The installed pintle injector, unique to TRW-designed liquid-propulsion systems, provides improved reliability and less costly method of fuel–oxidizer impingement in the thrust chamber than conventional coaxial distributed-element injectors typically used on liquid bipropellant rocket engines.

== Specifications ==
- Number flown: 77 (Delta 2000 configuration)
- Dry mass: 300 pounds (140 kg) with columbium (niobium) nozzle extension installed
- Length: 51 inches (1,300 mm) – gimbal attachment to nozzle tip (minus nozzle extension)
- Maximum diameter: 34 inches (860 mm) (minus nozzle extension)
- Mounting: gimbal attachment above injector
- Engine cycle: pressure fed (15.5 atm reservoir)
- Fuel: 50:50 N_{2}O_{4}/UDMH (Aerozine 50) at 8.92 kg/s
- Oxidizer: dinitrogen tetroxide at 5.62 kg/s
- Oxidizer:fuel ratio: 1.60
- Thrust, vacuum: 42.923 kN
- Specific impulse, vacuum: 303 s
- Expansion ratio: 16:1 without nozzle extension; 43:1 with nozzle extension
- Cooling, upper thrust chamber: film
- Cooling, lower thrust chamber: ablative quartz phenolic;
- Cooling, nozzle extension: radiative
- Chamber pressure: 7.1 atm
- Ignition: hypergolic, started by 28 V electrical signal to on/off solenoid valves
- Burn time: 500 s for total of 5 starts; 10 × 350-s single burn

== Delta usage ==
The TR-201 engine was used as the second stage for 77 Delta launches between 1972 and 1988. The engine had a 100% reliability record during this 15 year operational period.
