= Delta 3000 =

American rocket

Delta 3000 series
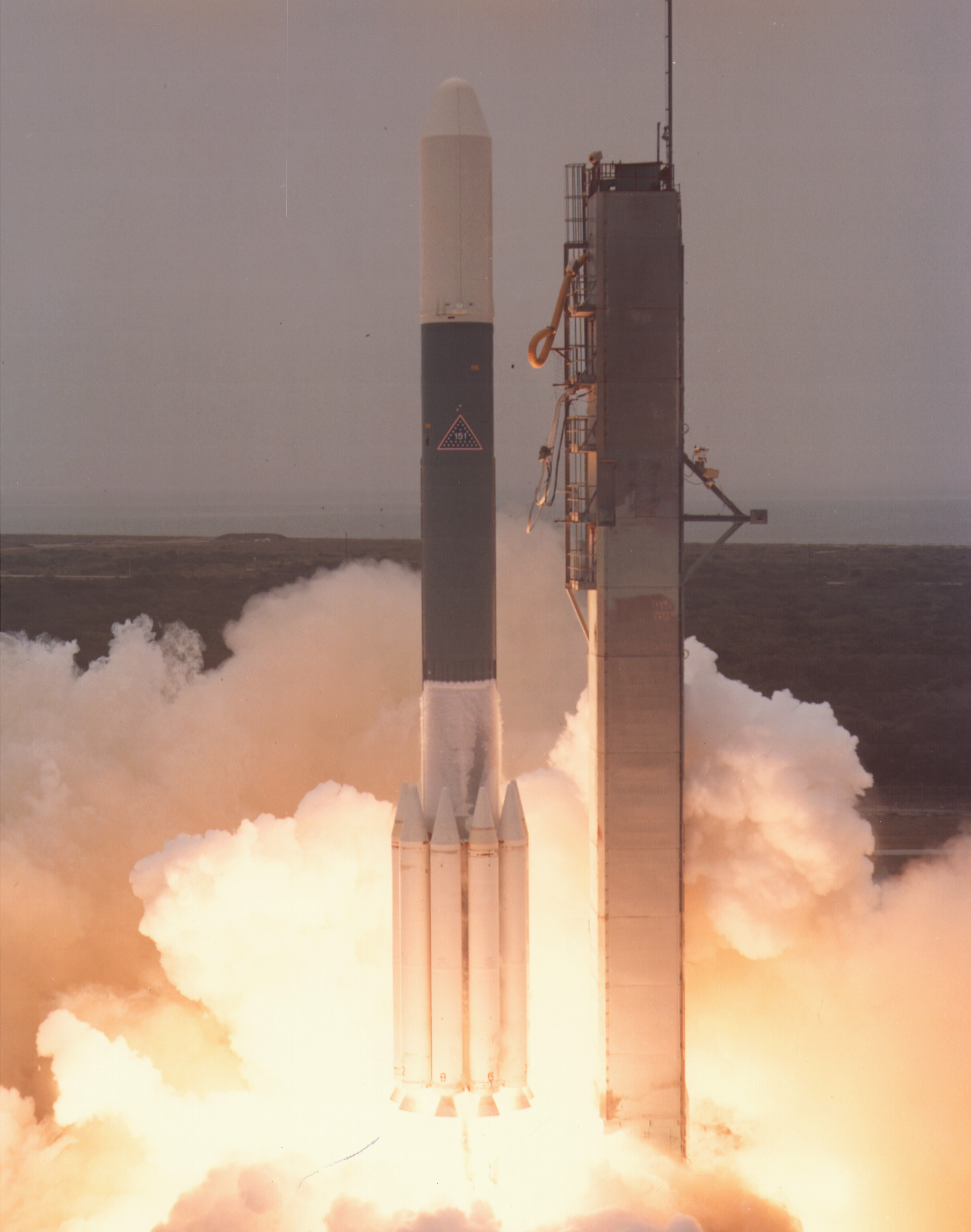
- Launch of SolarMax on a Delta 3910 7.2-J 6900.1
- Function: Expendable launch system
- Country of origin: United States

Launch history
- Status: Retired
- Launch sites: Cape Canaveral, LC-17; Vandenberg, SLC-2W
- Total launches: 38
- Success(es): 35
- Failure: 2
- Partial failure: 1
- First flight: 13 December 1975
- Last flight: 24 March 1989

The Delta 3000 series was an American expendable launch system which was used to conduct 38 orbital launches between 1975 and 1989. It was a member of the Delta family of rockets. Several variants existed, which were differentiated by a four digit numerical code.

== Configurations ==
The first stage was the RS-27 powered Extended Long Tank Thor, first flown on the 2000-series. Three or nine Castor-4 solid rocket boosters (SRB) were attached to increase thrust at lift-off, replacing the less powerful Castor-2 boosters used on earlier models. Two second stages were available; the Delta-P, which had been flown on the Delta 1000 and 2000 series, or the Delta-K, an uprated version with the Aerojet engine. Some launches used a three-stage configuration in order to reach higher orbits. A Star-37D, Star-37E, or Star-48B PAM-D could be used as an upper stage. Launches with PAM-D upper stages were designated Delta 3XX0 PAM-D, rather than assigning a code to the upper stage for use in the four-digit sequence. From the 4000-series onwards, the PAM-D received the upper stage code "5", however this was not applied retrospectively to 3000-series rockets, which were still in service at the time.

The Delta 3000 could put a payload of 954 kg (2,103 lb) to a Geostationary transfer orbit.

== History ==
The Delta 3000 was launched from Space Launch Complex 2W (SLC-2W) at Vandenberg Air Force Base and Launch Complex 17A and 17B (LC-17A and LC-17B) at Cape Canaveral. Of the 38 launches, there were two failures and one partial failure.

The first, Vehicle 134 lifted from LC-17A at Cape Canaveral on 13 September 1977 with an Italian-built OTS communications satellite. Fifty-two seconds after liftoff, the Delta exploded. Booster and satellite debris were dredged from the sea bottom and it was ultimately discovered that a hairline crack in one SRB motor caused exhaust gas to escape and burn through the Delta's RP-1 tank, igniting the propellant. When the booster had been assembled on the pad in May 1977, a handling accident occurred with the SRB motors that apparently damaged one of them. The payload fairing disintegrated at vehicle breakup and the OTS satellite was ripped apart by aerodynamic loads. Parts of the solar panels, batteries, and hydrazine propellant tanks were recovered from the Atlantic Ocean. There had been an upper stage failure of a Delta 2000 series in April and three weeks later, an Atlas-Centaur exploded 55 seconds after liftoff. NASA was particularly vexed by the string of accidents in 1977 because they had had a perfect run the year before (16 launches in 1976 without a failure). While this record (three failures out of 16 NASA launches during 1977) would have been acceptable in the 1960s, it was not welcomed at all in the late 1970s after the early "Wild West" days of the space program had passed and the hardware was supposed to be mature.

The second Delta 3000 failure, Vehicle 150, was launched on 7 December 1979, but its Satcom communications satellite remained trapped in low Earth orbit when the third stage failed to ignite.

The third, Vehicle 178, launched on 3 May 1986 with a GOES weather satellite. This was televised on CNN to mark NASA's first launch since the Challenger disaster four months earlier, but proved to be a serious embarrassment to the program. At 225:18 UTC, Delta 178 lifted from LC-17A. All went entirely normal until T+71 seconds when the first stage engine abruptly cut off. With no attitude control, the launch vehicle quickly started tumbling out of control. The satellite and third stage were stripped off by aerodynamic forces, followed by loss of booster telemetry data. At T+91 seconds, the Range Safety officer sent the destruct command. Initial examination of telemetry revealed no obvious explanation for the main engine cutoff. All booster systems had operated satisfactorily up to that point, and engine shutdown occurred without any prior warning. Following the loss of telemetry data at T+80 seconds, film and photographic data confirmed that the solid rocket boosters had continued operating until final destruct, and that the second stage propellant tanks also ruptured from aerodynamic forces. More detailed telemetry examination, ultimately traced the failure to a massive electrical short in the first stage. Two voltage spikes in the power system caused a sudden major load on the first stage battery, which ordinarily supplied 9 amperes of power, but momentary shot up to 188 amperes, a more than 2000% increase that quickly drained it and resulted in loss of the electrical current used to keep the engine valves open. Investigators ultimately traced the incident to a damaged wiring harness; there had recently been a switch from polyvinyl chloride wire insulation to Teflon. Because engineers had not taken into account the shape of the wiring harness when this modification was made, it banged against other components inside the first stage due to vibration during launch. The insulation was then rubbed off the wires, exposing them and allowing a short to occur. The loss of GOES-G had been a blow to the National Oceanic and Atmospheric Administration's (NOAA) weather satellite network, but this was partially compensated for in September 1986 when an Atlas successfully launched a NOAA-G (NOAA-10) satellite from Vandenberg Air Force Base.

During the first half of the 1980s, the rate of Delta launches drastically declined due to the Space Shuttle taking a large part of its missions. Orders for the booster slowed to a trickle and McDonnell-Douglas came close to completely shutting down production. 1985 was the first year since the Delta family's introduction in 1960 that no launches took place, but the Challenger Disaster brought about a renewed need for disposable launch vehicles and orders soon picked up again. While only a handful of Delta launches took place in 1986–88, nine flew in 1989 and the 1990s would see a busy schedule most years except 1994–1995 (seven launches during those two years).

Delta 178 was largely the result of poor quality control due to plans for eventually phasing out ELVs in favor of the space shuttle - most of the engineers who worked on the program had left and one senior McDonnell-Douglass engineer remarked that 178 had "the worst quality control I ever saw on a Delta vehicle". Because it was assumed that the Delta would soon be retired from use, complaints about the poor assembly quality went unheard. After the accident, a thorough investigation of wiring systems in various ELV families was undertaken, which discovered that, among other things, the Delta had thinner wiring insulation than Titan, Atlas, and other launch vehicles. Moreover, Teflon insulation had the unique ability of melting and re-fusing when heated by electrical arcs. Eventually however, a short occurred that overpowered the Teflon's "self healing" ability.
