= Delta 2000 =

Series of American expendable launch systems

Delta 2000 series
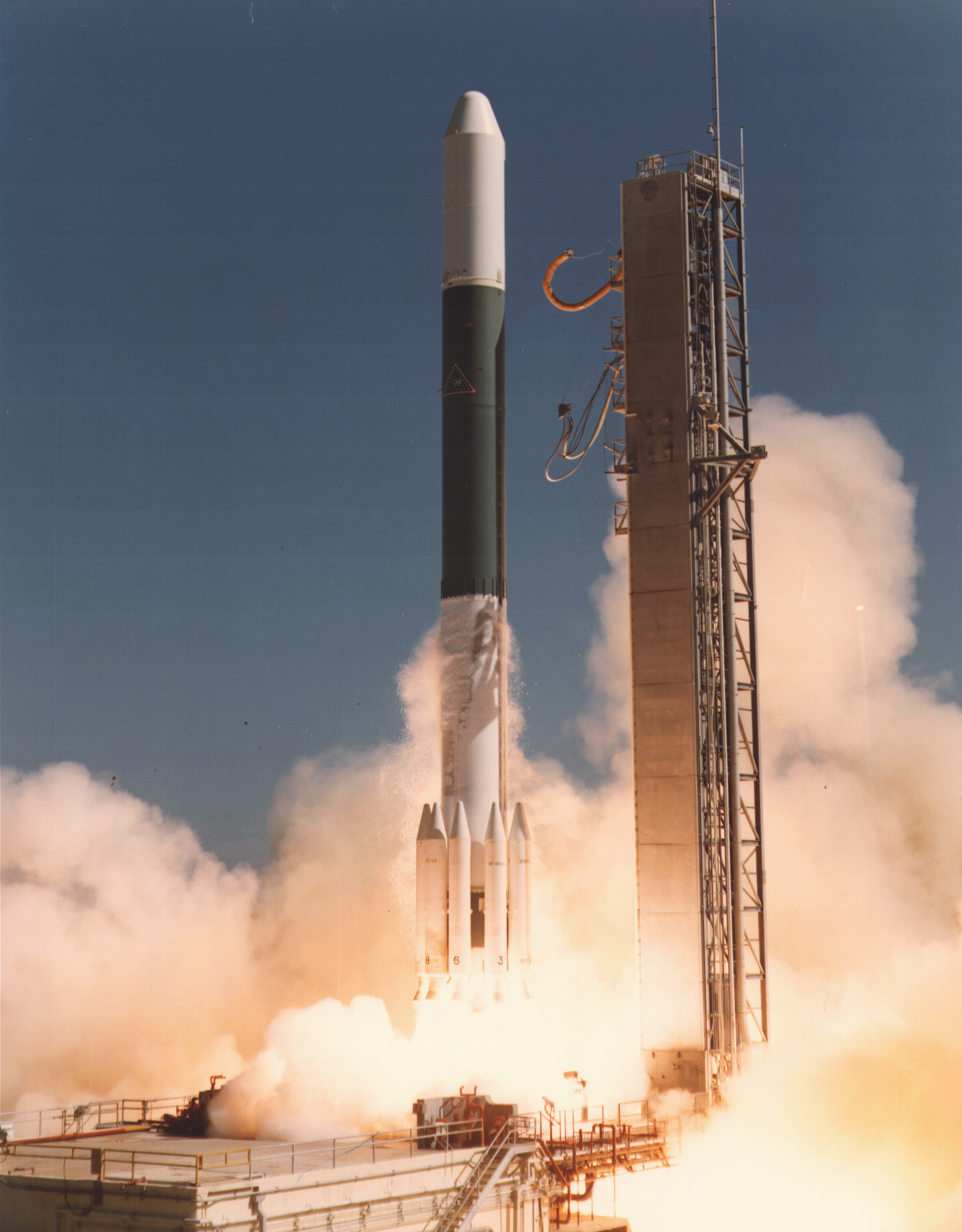
- Launch of IUE on a Delta 2914 J-8
- Function: Expendable launch system
- Country of origin: United States

Size
- Height: 35 m (114 ft)
- Diameter: 2.44 m (8 ft)
- Mass: 130,392 kg (287,465 lb)

Payload to GTO (Geostationary transfer orbit)
- Mass: 724 kg

Launch history
- Status: Retired
- Launch sites: Cape Canaveral, LC-17; Vandenberg, SLC-2W
- Total launches: 44
- Success(es): 43
- Failure: 1
- First flight: 19 January 1974
- Last flight: 6 October 1981

Booster stage
- Powered by: 9 x Castor 2
- Maximum thrust: 258.915 kilonewtons (58,206 lb_{f})
- Burn time: 37 seconds
- Propellant: Solid

First stage
- Powered by: 1 x Delta-Thor RS-27
- Maximum thrust: 1,030.218 kilonewtons (231,602 lb_{f})
- Burn time: 223 seconds
- Propellant: RP-1/LOX

Second stage
- Powered by: 1 x Delta P
- Maximum thrust: 41.923 kilonewtons (9,425 lb_{f})
- Burn time: 322 seconds
- Propellant: N_{2}O_{4}/Aerozine-50

Third stage
- Powered by: 1 x Burner II
- Maximum thrust: 43.551 kilonewtons (9,791 lb_{f})
- Burn time: 42 seconds
- Propellant: Solid

The Delta 2000 series was an American expendable launch system which was used to conduct forty-four orbital launches between 1974 and 1981. It was a member of the Delta family of rockets, sometimes called Thorad Delta. Several variants existed, which were differentiated by a four digit numerical code. The Delta 1000, 2000 and 3000 series used surplus NASA Apollo program rocket engines for its first and second stages.

The first stage was an Extended Long Tank Thor, re-engined with the Rocketdyne RS-27 replacing the earlier MB-3-III engine. The RS-27 engine was a rebranded H-1 engine used in the Saturn 1B with minor changes. Three or nine Castor-2 solid rocket boosters were attached to increase thrust at lift-off. The Delta-P second stage used the TRW TR-201 engine. The TR-201 engine was a Lunar Module Descent Engine reconfigured for fixed thrust output. Launches which required a three-stage configuration in order to reach higher orbits used the Thiokol Star-37D or Star-37E upper stage as an apogee kick motor.

Delta 2000 launches occurred from Space Launch Complex 2W at Vandenberg AFB and both pads of Launch Complex 17 at Cape Canaveral. Forty-three out of forty-four launches were successful. The single failure being the maiden flight, 19 January 1974, which placed Skynet 2A into a useless orbit. A short circuit in an electronics package circuit board (on second stage) left the upper stages and satellite in an unstable low orbit (96 x 3,406 km x 37.6°) that rapidly decayed. An investigation revealed that a substandard coating had been used on the circuit board.

The cost of each launch was estimated on average at $28.52 million, depending on the combination of carrier rocket.
