= List of Atlas LV3B launches =

List of rocket launches

Atlas LV-3B
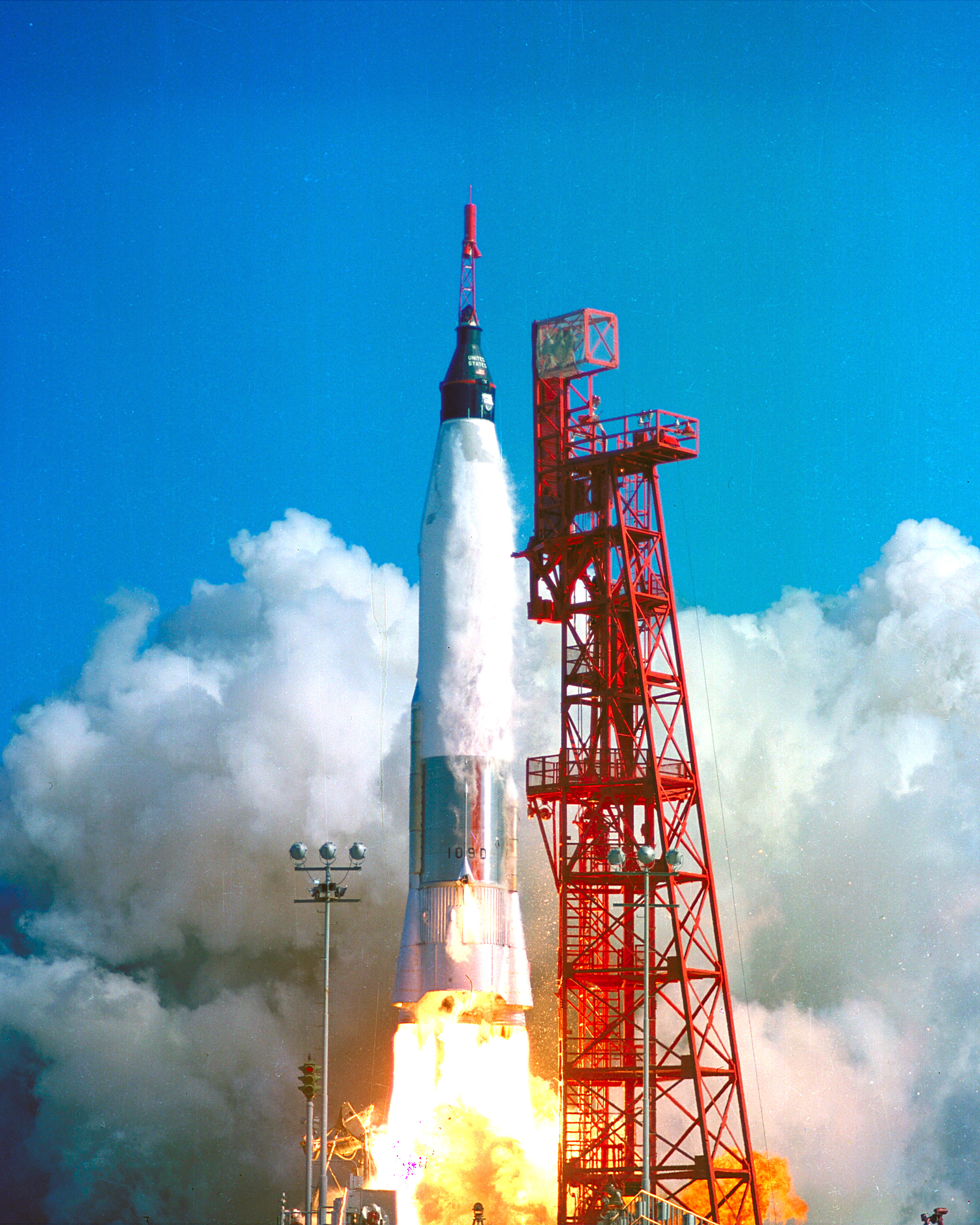
- An Atlas D LV-3B launching Mercury-Atlas 6 (Note: Reference for entire infobox)
- Function: Crewed expendable launch system
- Manufacturer: Convair
- Country of origin: United States

Size
- Height: 28.7 metres (94.3 ft)
- Diameter: 3.0 metres (10.0 ft) width over boost fairing 4.9 metres (16 ft)
- Mass: 120,000 kilograms (260,000 lb)
- Stages: 1 1/2

Capacity

Payload to LEO
- Mass: 1,360 kilograms (3,000 lb)

Launch history
- Status: Retired
- Launch sites: CCAFS LC-14
- Total launches: 9
- Success(es): 7
- Failure: 2
- First flight: 29 July 1960
- Last flight: 15 May 1963

Boosters
- No. boosters: 1
- Powered by: 2 Rocketdyne XLR-89-5
- Maximum thrust: 1,517.4 kilonewtons (341,130 lbf)
- Burn time: 135 seconds
- Propellant: RP-1/LOX

First stage
- Diameter: 3.0 metres (10.0 ft)
- Powered by: 1 Rocketdyne XLR-105-5
- Maximum thrust: 363.22 kilonewtons (81,655 lbf)
- Burn time: 5 minutes
- Propellant: RP-1/LOX

The Atlas LV-3B, Atlas D Mercury Launch Vehicle or Mercury-Atlas Launch Vehicle, was a human-rated expendable launch system used as part of the United States Project Mercury to send astronauts into low Earth orbit. Manufactured by American aircraft manufacturing company Convair, it was derived from the SM-65D Atlas missile, and was a member of the Atlas family of rockets.

The Atlas D missile was the natural choice for Project Mercury since it was the only launch vehicle in the US arsenal that could put the spacecraft into orbit and also had many flights from which to gather data. But its reliability was far from perfect, and Atlas launches ending in explosions were an all-too common sight at Cape Canaveral. The Atlas had also been originally designed as a weapon system, thus its design and reliability did not need to necessarily be 100% perfect. As such, significant steps had to be taken to human-rate the missile and make it safe and reliable unless NASA wished to spend several years developing a dedicated launch vehicle for crewed programs or else wait for the next-generation Titan II ICBM to become operational. Atlas' stage-and-a-half configuration was seen as preferable to the two stage Titan in that all engines were ignited at liftoff, making it easier to test for hardware problems during pre-launch checks.

Shortly after being chosen for the program in early 1959, the Mercury astronauts were taken to watch the second D-series Atlas test, which exploded a minute into launch. This was the fifth straight complete or partial Atlas failure and the booster was at this point nowhere near reliable enough to carry a nuclear warhead or an uncrewed satellite, let alone a human passenger. Plans to human-rate Atlas were effectively still on the drawing board and Convair estimated that 75% reliability would be achieved by early 1961 and 85% reliability by the end of the year. Despite the Atlas' developmental problems, NASA had the benefit of conducting Project Mercury simultaneously with the Atlas R&D program which gave plenty of test flights to draw data from as well as test modified equipment for Mercury.

== Launch outcomes ==
- Failure
- Success
- Cancelled

== Launch history ==
Flight	Crew member	Mission name	Date	Outcome
1	Uncrewed	Mercury Atlas-3	Tuesday, April 25, 1961 11:15 AM EST (Note: All times are in Eastern Daylight Time.)	Failure
1	First flight of the Atlas LV-3B. Was an uncrewed test flight. Resulted in failure. The cause remains disputed.			
2	Uncrewed	Mercury Atlas-4	Wednesday, September 13, 1961 10:04 AM EDT	Success
2	Second uncrewed test flight. The launch was successful.			
3	Uncrewed	Mercury Atlas-5	Wednesday Nov 29th, 1961 10:07 AM EST	Success
3	Final uncrewed test flight. Launch was successful.			
4	John Glenn	Mercury Atlas-6	Tuesday, February 20, 1962 9:47 AM EST	Success
4	First crewed flight of the Atlas LV-3B. Successfully launched John Glenn to become the first American to orbit the Earth. First flight of John Glenn.			
5	Scott Carpenter	Mercury Atlas-7	Thursday, May 24, 1962 8:45 AM EDT	Success
5	Second crewed flight of the Atlas LV-3B. First flight of Scott Carpenter.			
6	Wally Schirra	Mercury Atlas-8	Wednesday, October 3, 1962 8:15 AM EDT	Success
6	Third crewed flight of the Atlas LV-3B. First flight of Wally Schirra.			
7	Gordon Cooper	Mercury Atlas-9	Wednesday, May 15, 1963 9:04 AM EDT	Success
7	Final flight of the Atlas LV-3B. Final crewed flight of the Atlas LV-3B. First flight of Gordon Cooper.			
8	Alan Shepard	Mercury-Atlas 10	October 1963	Cancelled
8	Was to be second flight of Alan Shepard. Was to be final flight of the Atlas LV-3B. Was cancelled because it was determined to be too risky.			

== See also ==
- Project Mercury
