= MA4 =

MA-4 may refer to:

- Massachusetts's 4th congressional district
- Massachusetts Route 4
- Mercury-Atlas 4, a test flight of Project Mercury
