= American Space Museum =

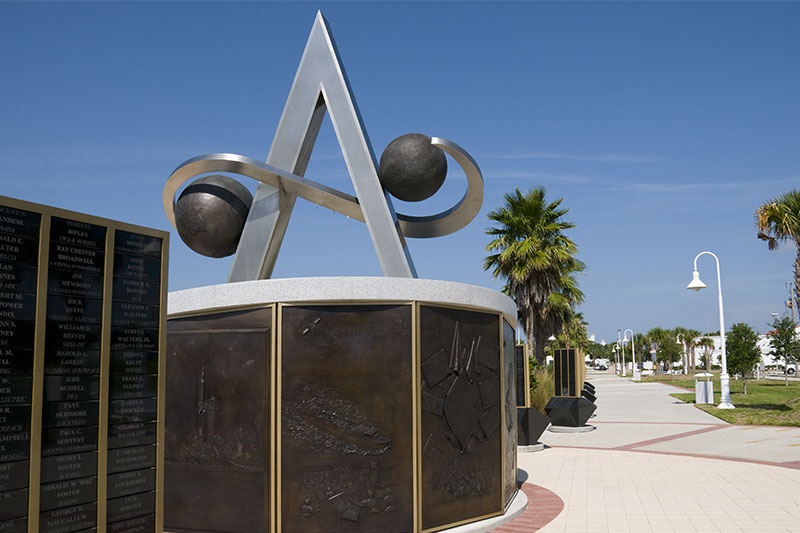
- Apollo Monument in Space View Park
- Established: 1994
- Location: Titusville, Florida, USA
- Coordinates: 28.614000°N 80.806000°W
- Type: Space museum and outdoor monuments
- Director: Karan Conklin
- Website: US Space Walk of Fame

The American Space Museum is a museum in Titusville, Florida. It includes the US Space Walk of Fame, an outdoor plaza on the Indian River that honors both the astronauts and the NASA and contractor personnel who made American crewed space exploration possible. The monuments surround a pool and are dedicated to the Mercury, Gemini, Apollo and Space Shuttle programs. The museum houses related exhibits and artifacts and is located at 308 Pine Street.

== Mission ==
The stated mission of the museum is, “Preserving Achievement; Inspiring Innovation.” To accomplish this, the museum preserves artifacts, history, and individual stories related to the American space program, and showcases them to inspire a new generation to innovate, invent, explore, and discover. The Walk of Fame at the park describes itself as "The first and only 'walk' in the nation that honors America's astronauts as well as the men and women behind the scenes who helped America lead the world in space exploration and accomplishments."

== Monuments ==
The monuments at the walk were created by the non-profit US Space Walk of Fame Foundation (USSWOFF) composed of community leaders, aerospace industry officials and current and retired space workers. The foundation is also building a database, currently including more than 10,000 names of space workers and their employers; and has received a grant to record oral histories from many of the men and women associated with the early American space program.

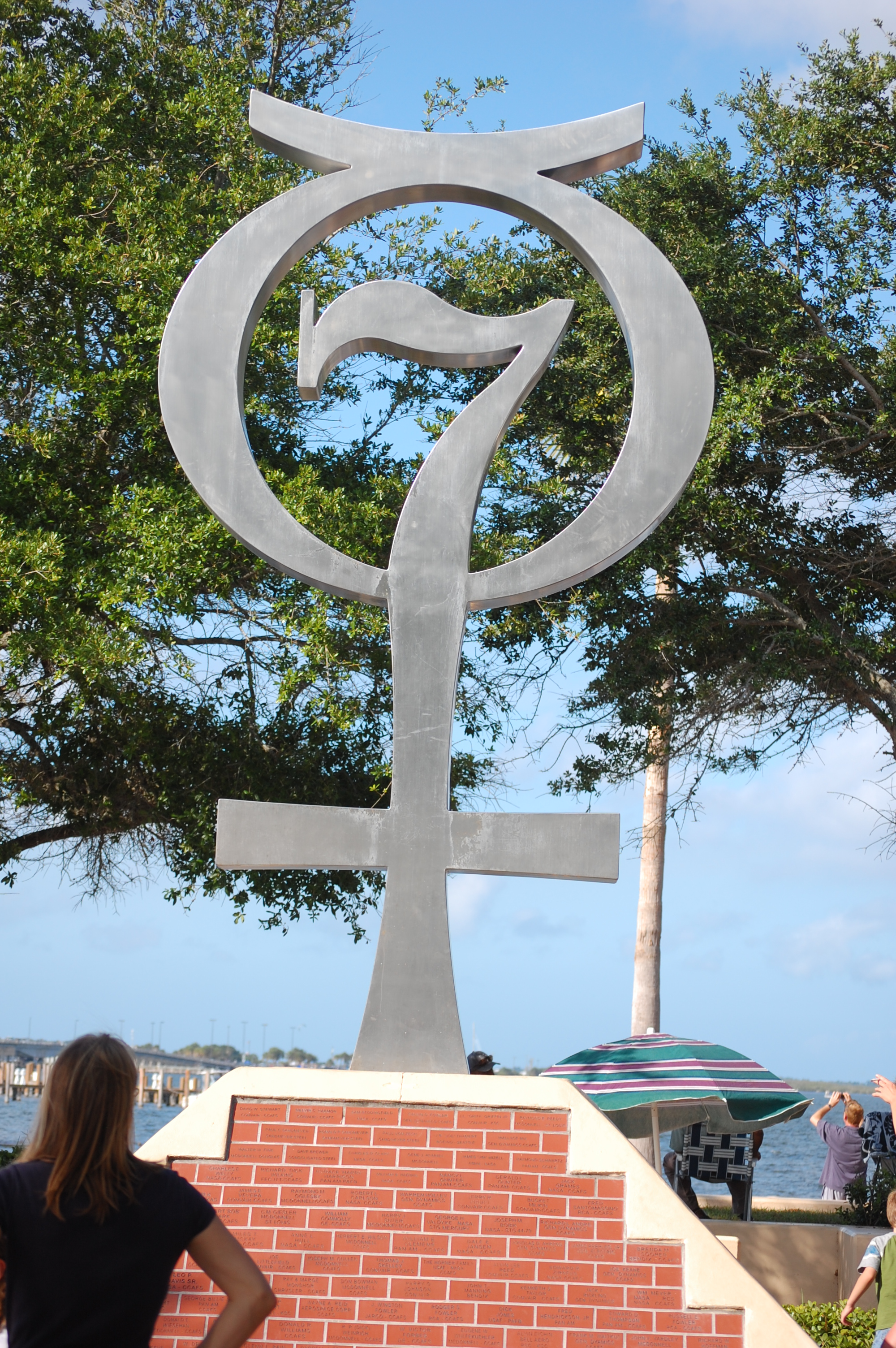
Mercury Monument

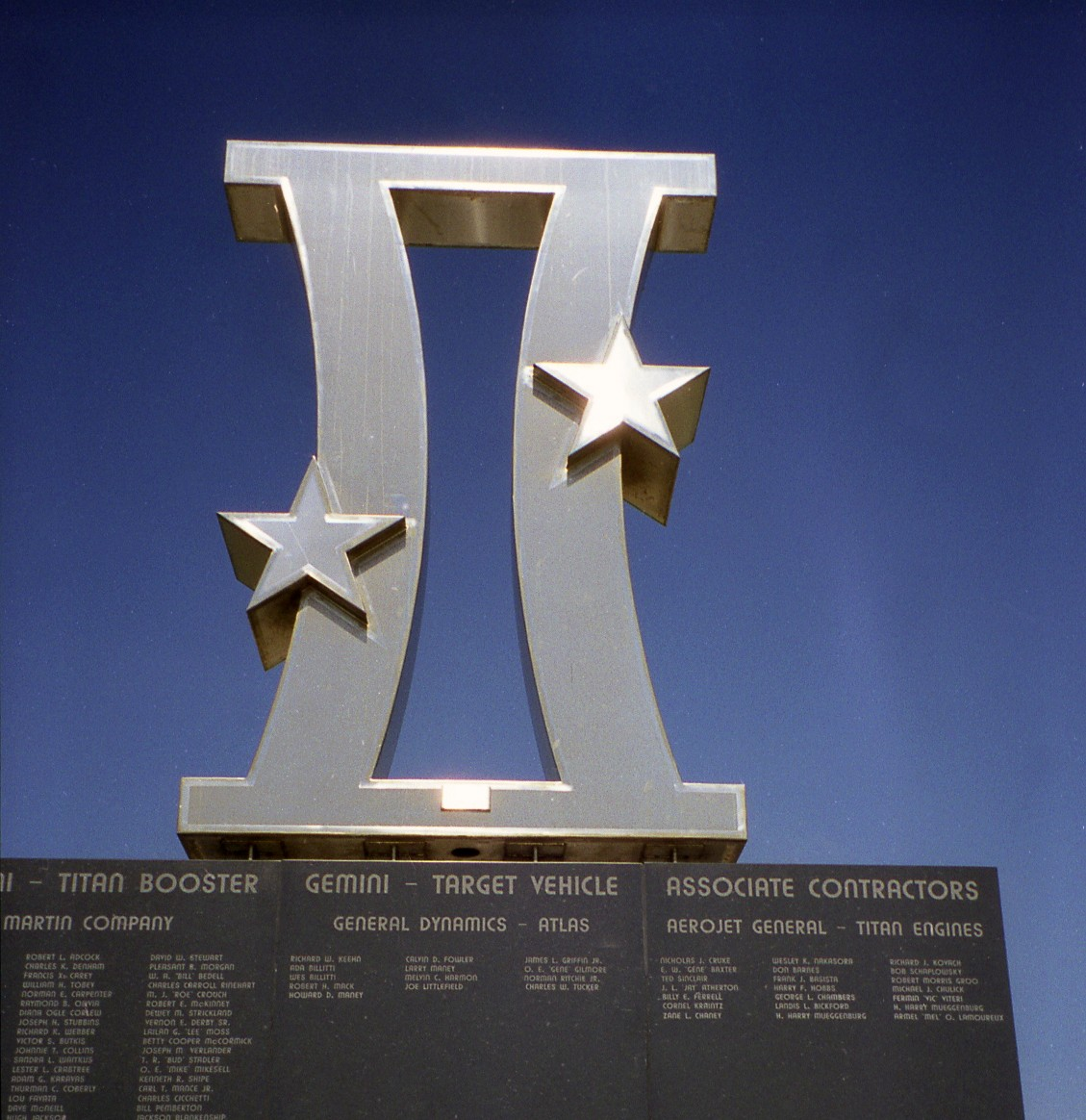
Gemini Monument

== History ==
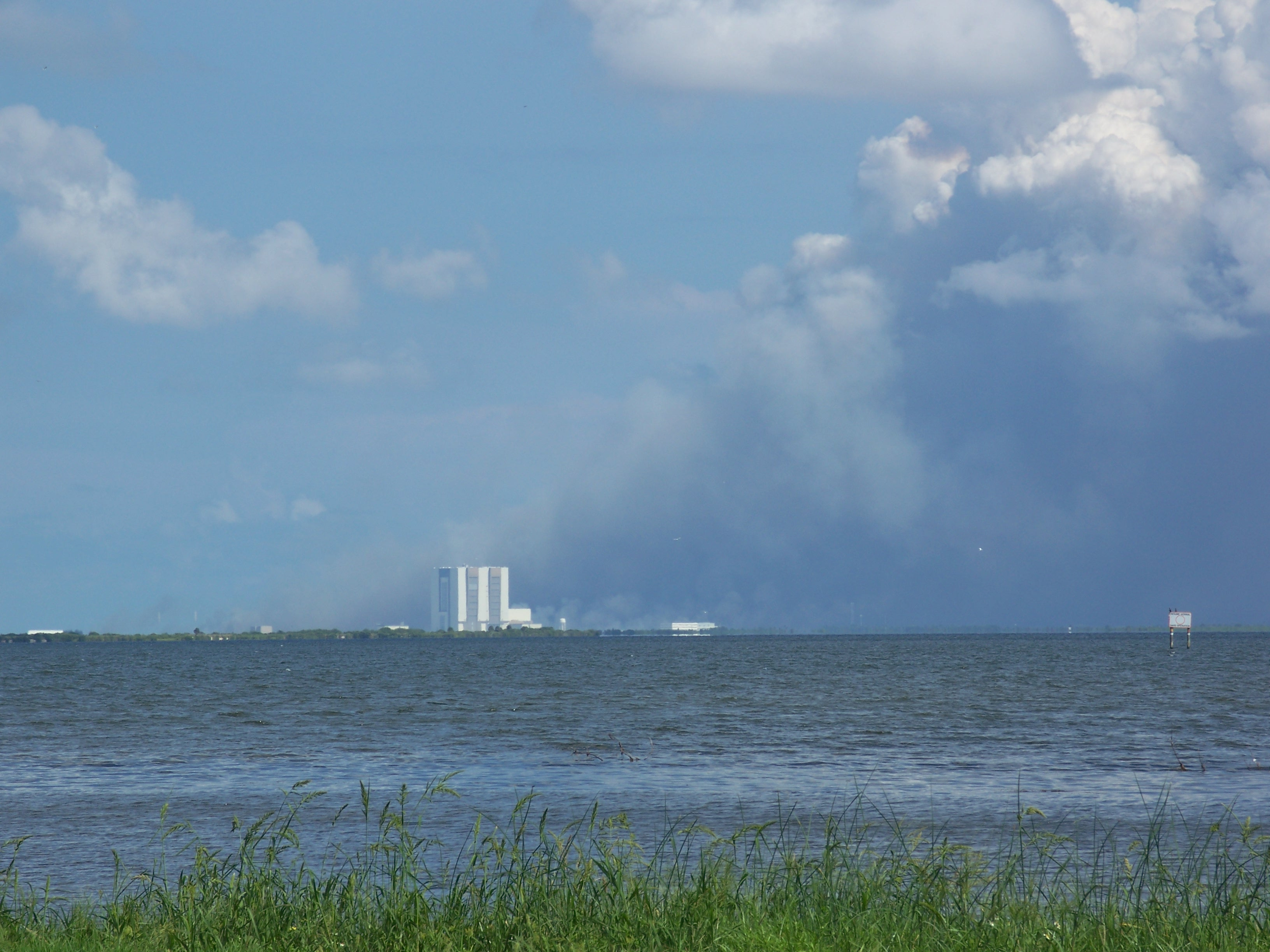
View of the Kennedy Space Center's Vehicle Assembly Building from Space View Park

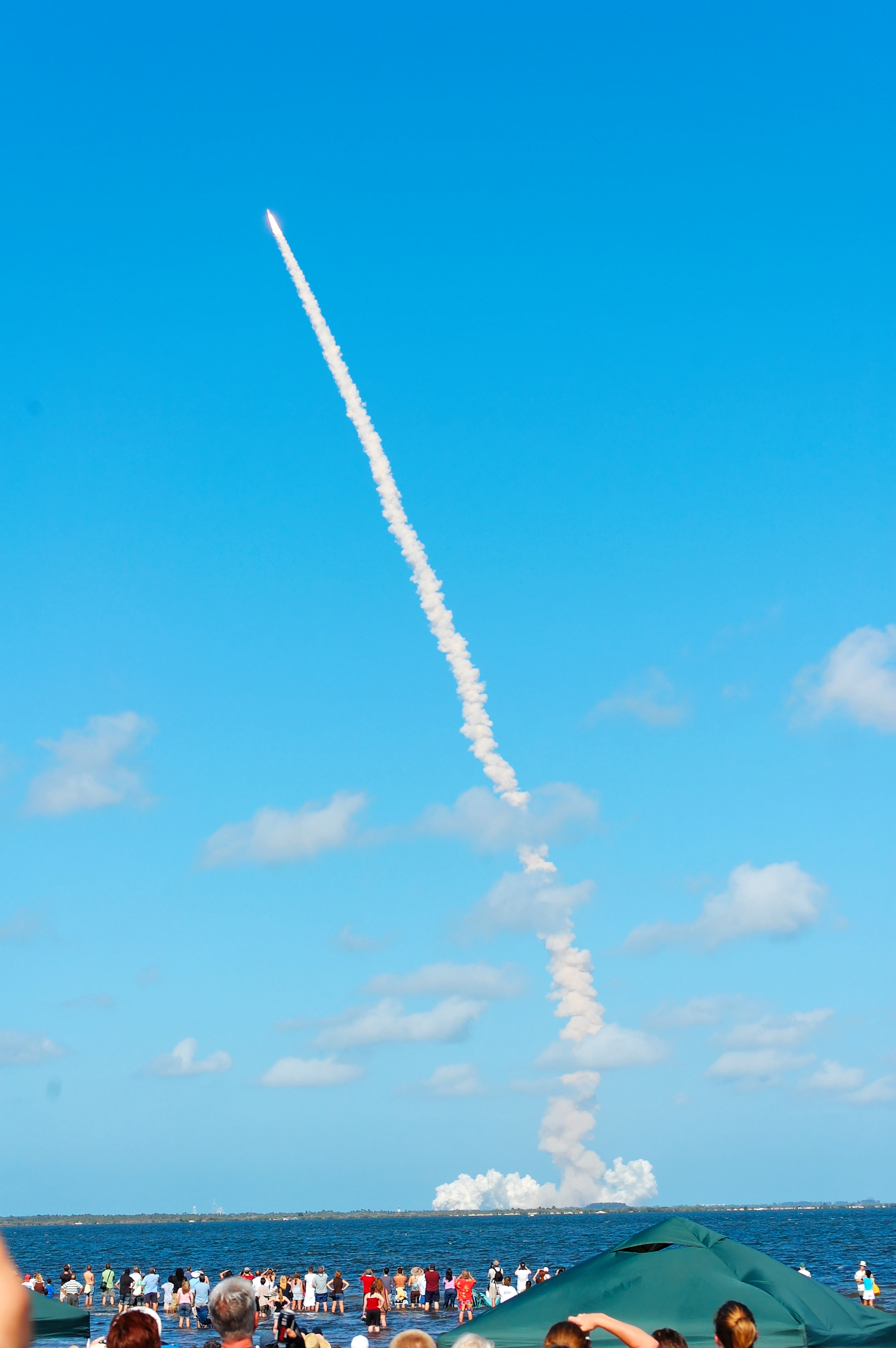
Launch of STS-124 as seen from Space View Park

The USSWOFF, a partnership between the foundation and the City of Titusville, created the US Space Walk of Fame as a major component of a redevelopment master plan for Titusville's downtown waterfront. It was conceived in 1988 by Titusville physician Dr. Doyle E. Chastain, who wrote a letter to the Titusville City Council suggesting such a project. With a downtown redevelopment program in progress and a desire to further enhance the area by taking advantage of the riverfront, the proposal was welcomed by the council and the city's Community Redevelopment Agency. The result was the US Space Walk of Fame Foundation.

Several volunteers including space pioneers created USSWOFF with the assistance of the City of Titusville, and the use of grants. The city provided the park infrastructure; and the foundation raised funds for the monuments, plaques, mission insignia markers and other space-related items to carry out the riverwalk's space theme. Engravings sold through the foundation enable space workers or their families to honor the worker by having his or her name engraved on the appropriate monument.

In July 1994, the city dedicated the new riverfront area, named Space View Park, which provides the anchor point for the US Space Walk of Fame. The Mercury Monument and mission plaques, with cast bronze hand prints of six of the original seven astronauts, were dedicated on May 12, 1995; and the Mercury mission insignia were unveiled on May 23, 1997. The Mercury monument is a copy of the one at Launch Complex 14.

Groundbreaking for the Gemini Monument, and the first Gemini reunion, were held on July 19, 1996. The Gemini Monument was dedicated on November 7, 1997. Groundbreaking for the Apollo Monument was held on July 16, 1999 at precisely 9:32 a.m. ET, exactly 30 years after the lift-off of Apollo 11. The event kicked off a week-long 30th anniversary celebration of the launch of Apollo 11 and the first crewed Moon landing. The Apollo Monument dedication and an Apollo reunion were held on July 17, 2009 with Apollo 15 astronaut Al Worden. The Gemini and Apollo monuments also include cast bronze hand prints of the surviving astronauts who flew those missions.

The Space Shuttle monument was dedicated in 2014.

== Museum ==
The American Space Museum, located nearby at 308 Pine Street, illustrates America's history in space exploration by displaying hundreds of artifacts, including photos, hardware, flight suits, Space Shuttle tiles, space patches and pins, and other memorabilia from personal collections of space workers. The museum also features several launch consoles from Launch Complex 36. The museum was the U.S. Space Walk of Fame Museum until the name changed in 2016 to the American Space Museum.

In 2016, the museum updated exhibits, focusing on new interpretive signage, new artifacts and interactive displays. The museum is adding 3D printers, computers, and other technology focused exhibits designed for children.

Also under the auspices of the museum is the STEAM space program, focusing on science and technology.

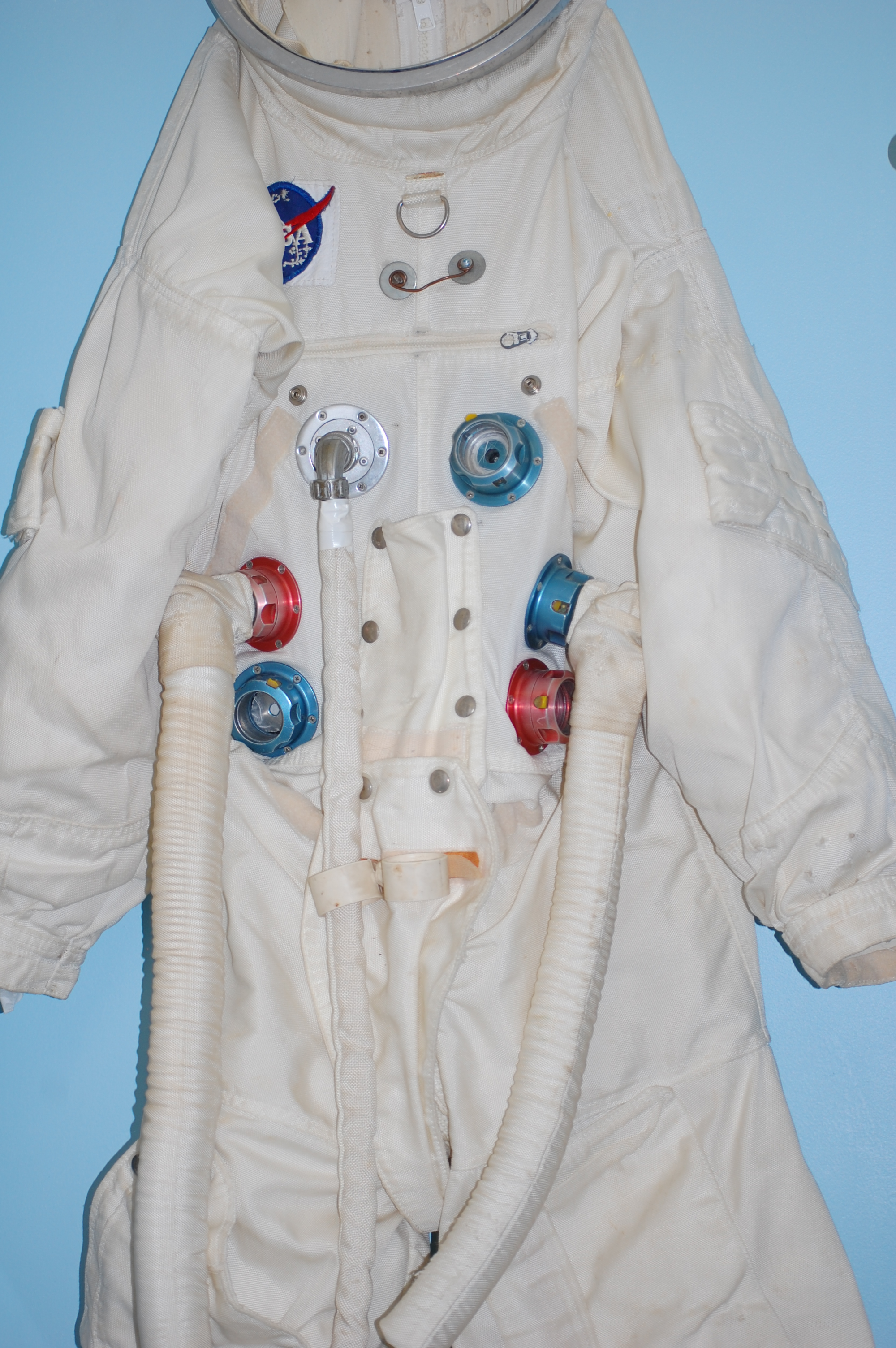
Space suit, probably Gemini

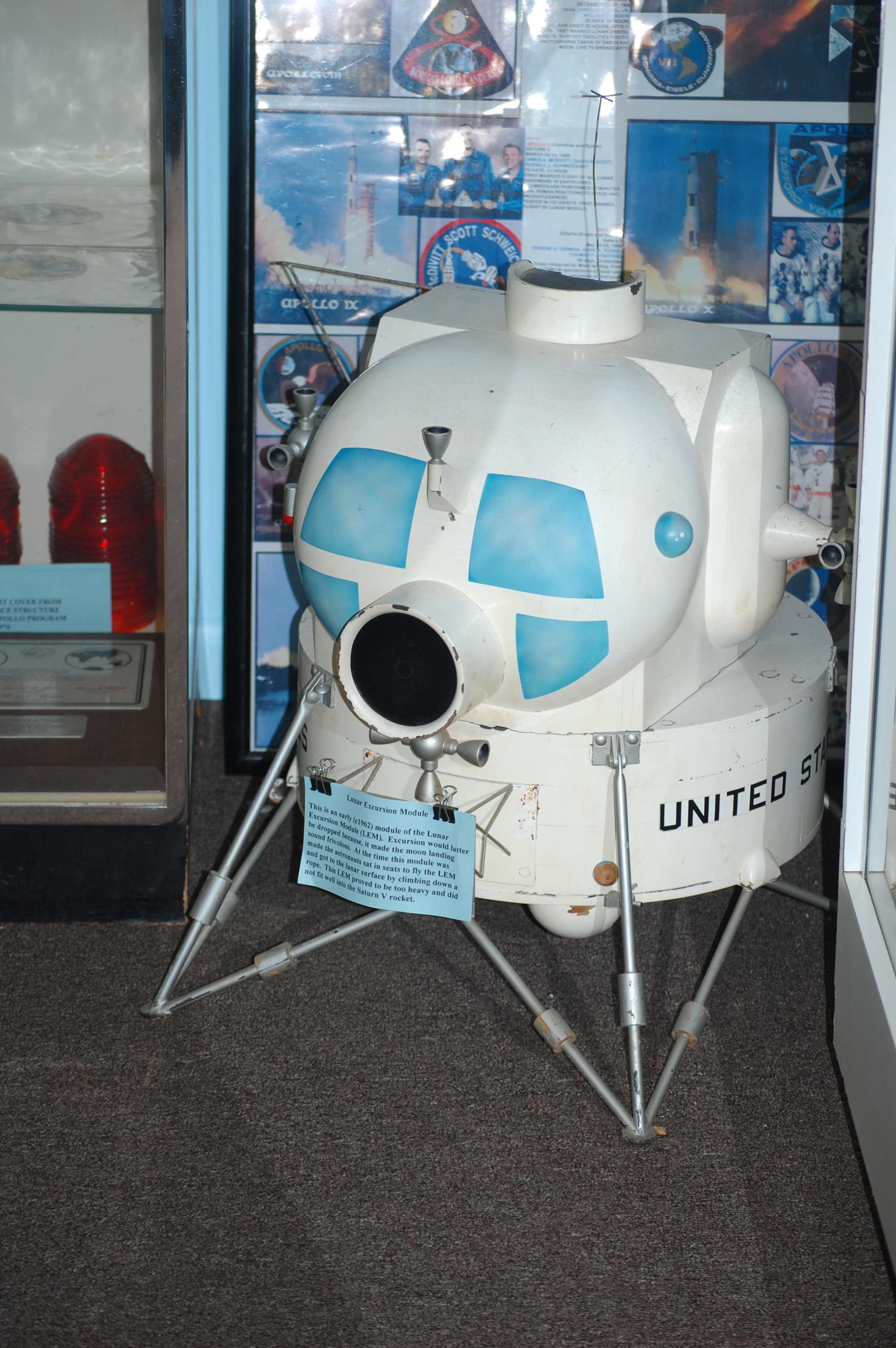
Early model of the Apollo Lunar Module

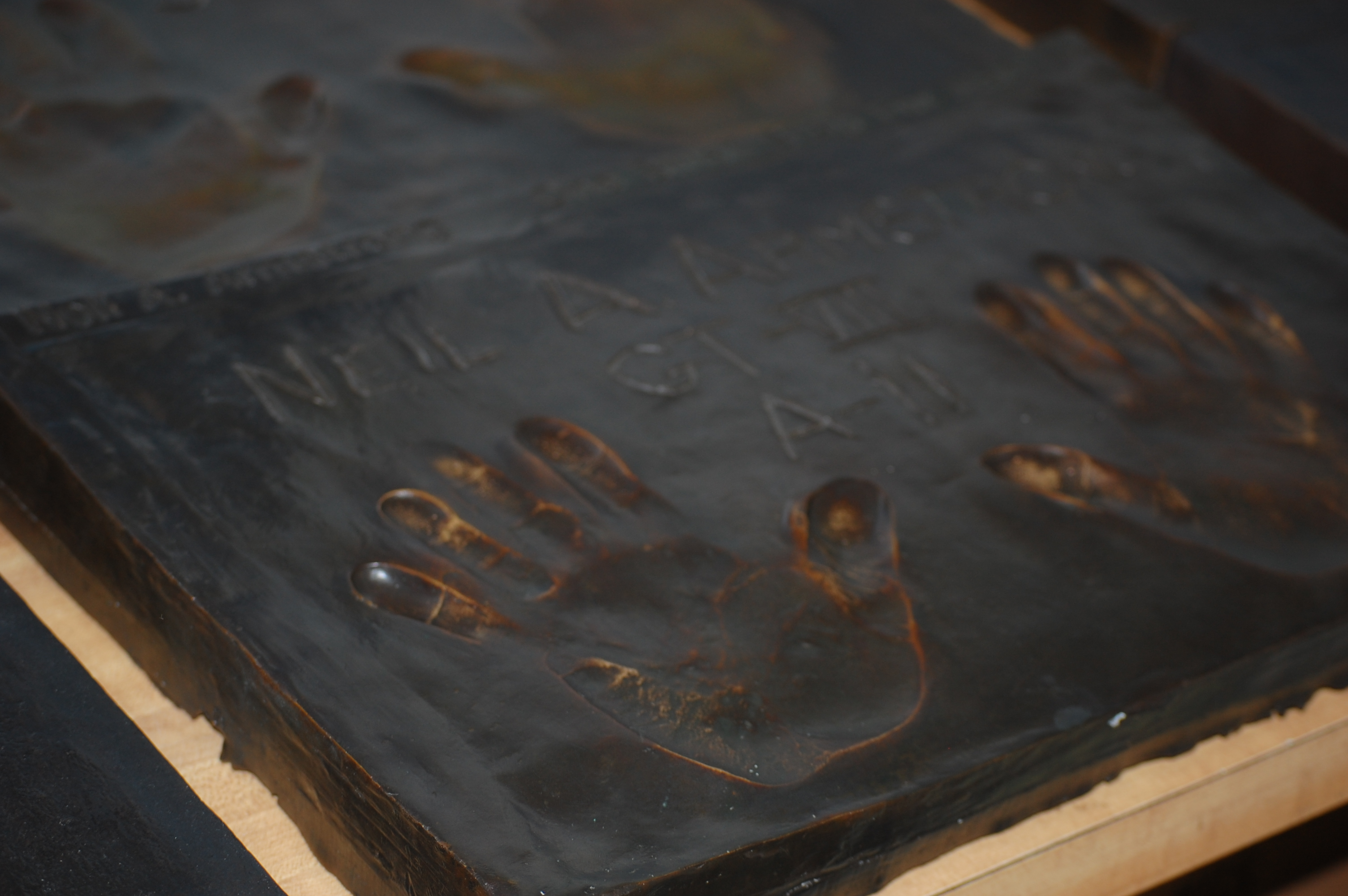
Neil Armstrong's hand prints

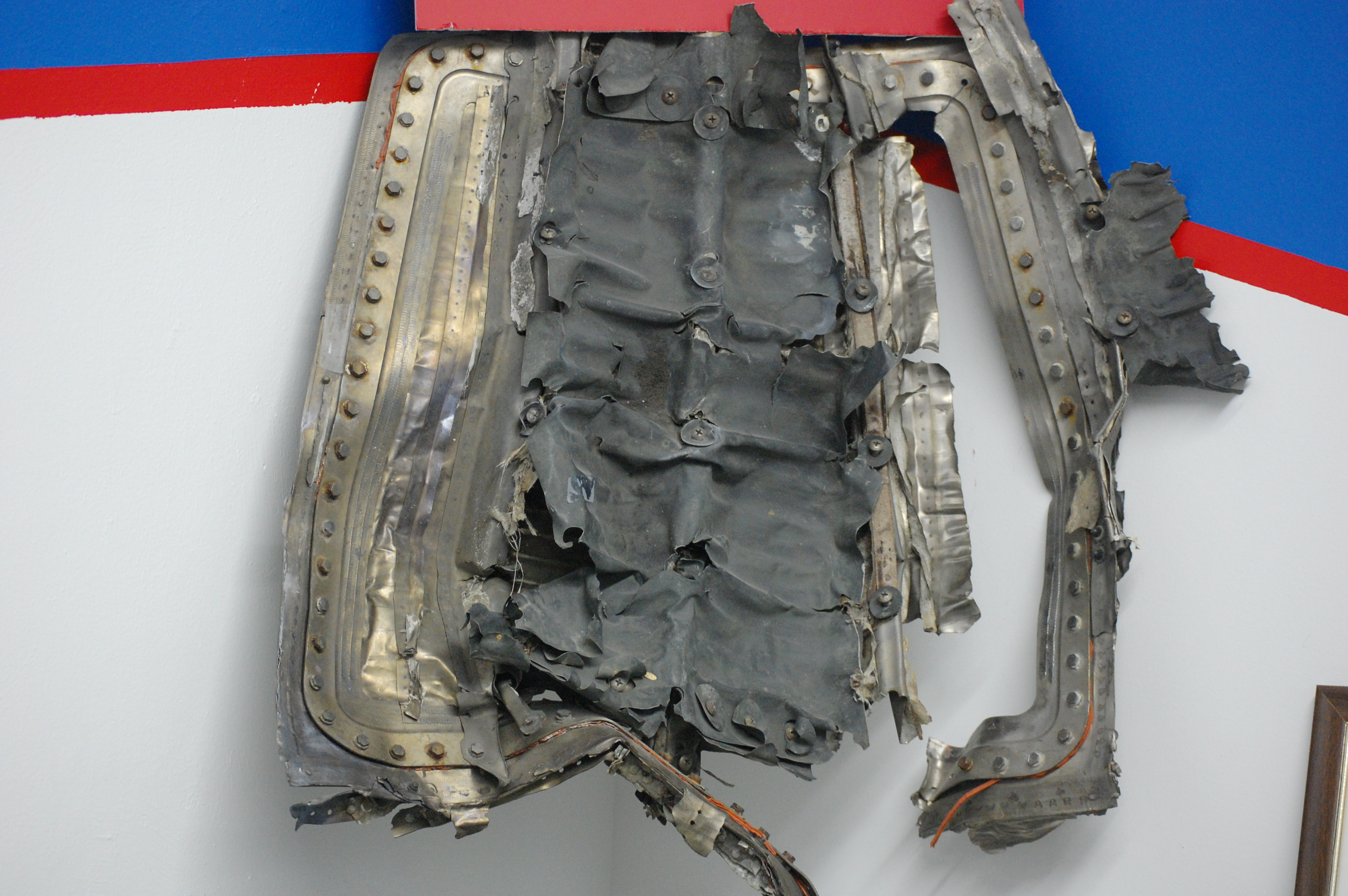
The hatch of the Mercury-Atlas 1 spacecraft

== See also ==
- United States Astronaut Hall of Fame
- Kennedy Space Center Visitor Complex
