= Mercury-Atlas 5 =

1961 American spaceflight of the Mercury program

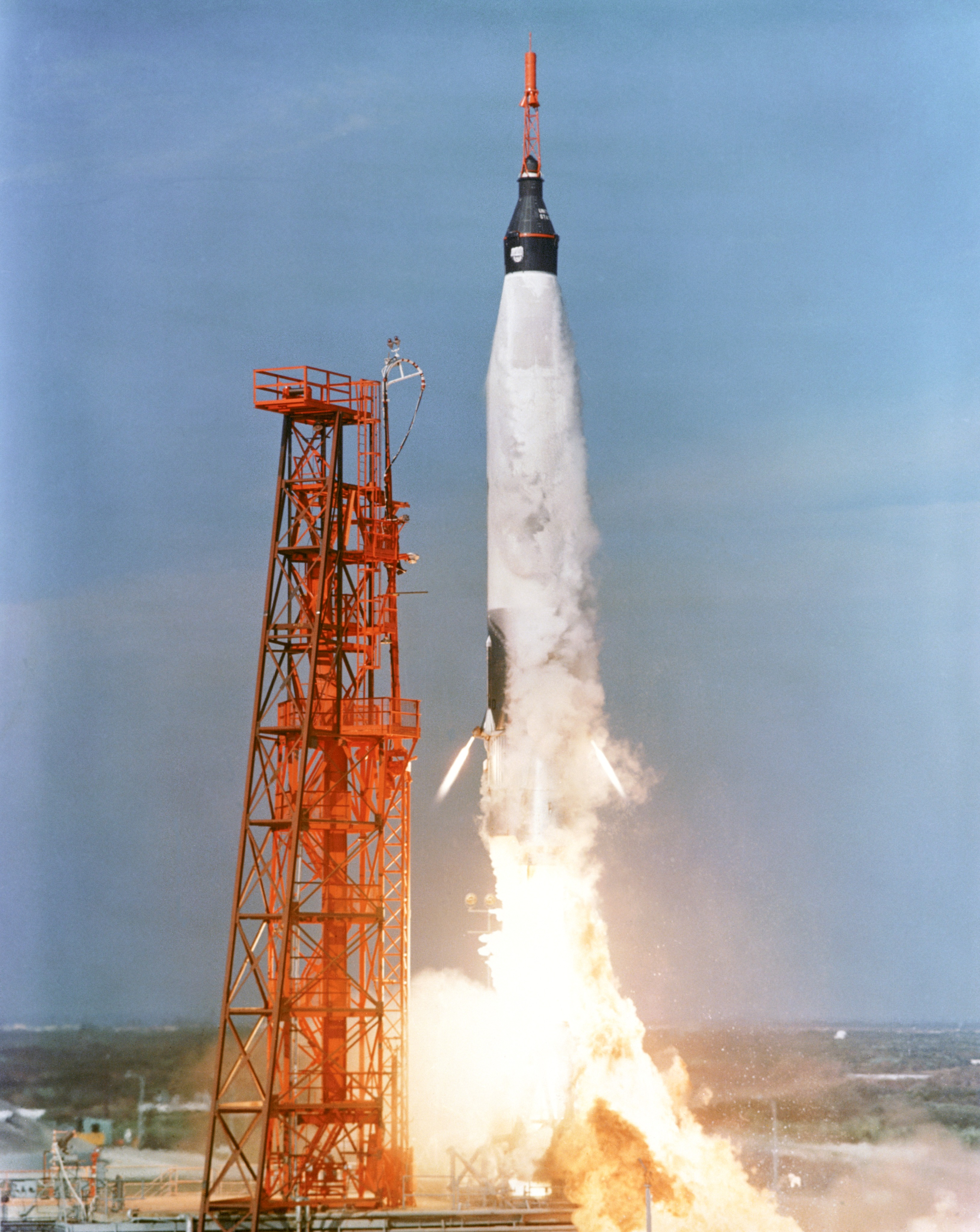
- An Atlas rocket launches the Mercury-Atlas 5 into orbit, November 29, 1961
- Mission type: Test flight
- Operator: NASA
- Harvard designation: 1961 Alpha Iota 1
- COSPAR ID: 1961-033A
- SATCAT no.: 208
- Mission duration: 3 hours, 20 minutes, 59 seconds
- Distance travelled: 81,902 kilometers (50,892 mi)
- Orbits completed: 2

Spacecraft properties
- Spacecraft: Mercury No.9
- Manufacturer: McDonnell Aircraft
- Launch mass: 1,331 kilograms (2,934 lb)

Crew
- Crew size: 1
- Members: Enos
- Callsign: Mercury-Atlas 5

Start of mission
- Launch date: November 29, 1961, 15:07:57 UTC
- Rocket: Atlas LV-3B 93-D
- Launch site: Cape Canaveral LC-14

End of mission
- Recovered by: USS Stormes
- Landing date: November 29, 1961, 18:28:56 UTC

Orbital parameters
- Reference system: Geocentric
- Regime: Low Earth
- Perigee altitude: 158 kilometers (85 nmi)
- Apogee altitude: 237 kilometers (128 nmi)
- Inclination: 32.5 degrees
- Period: 88.44 min
- Epoch: November 29, 1961
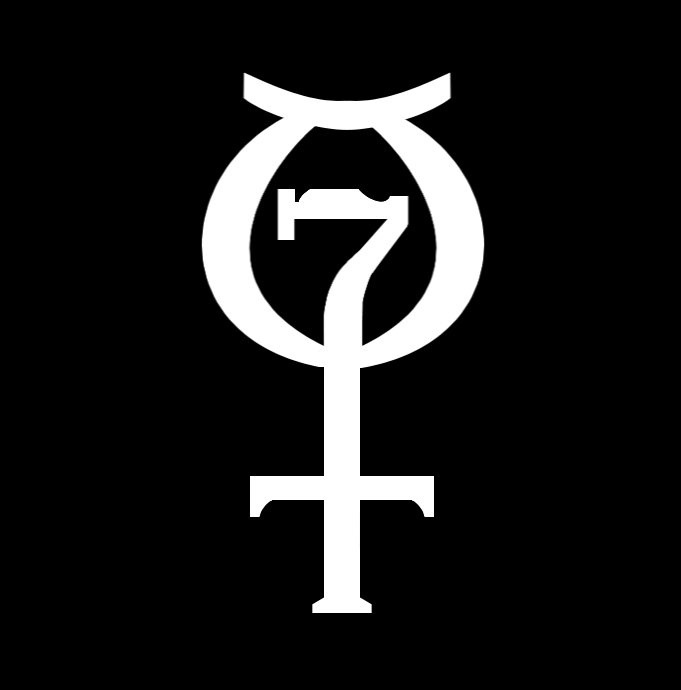
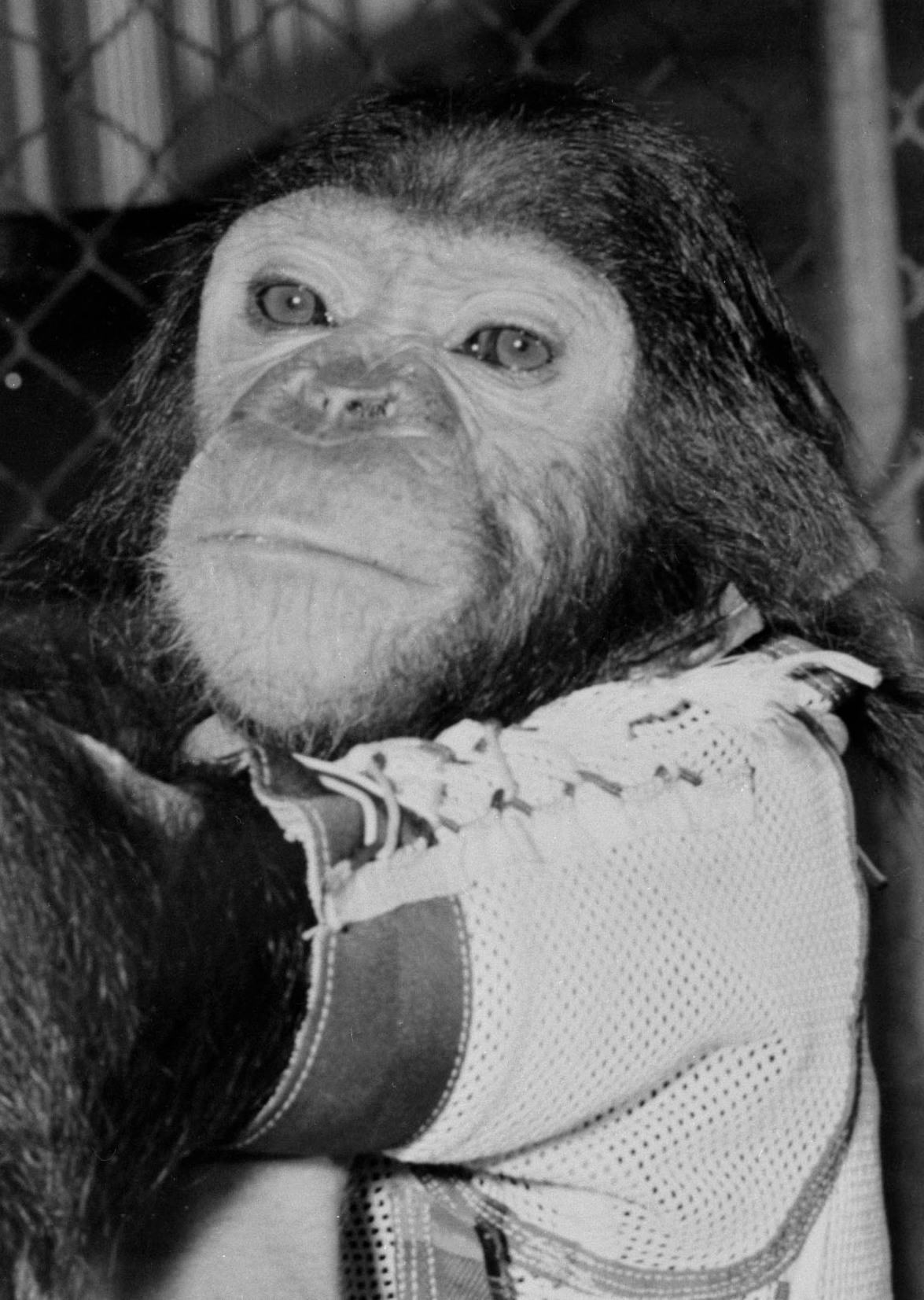
- On the Mercury-Atlas 5 flight Enos became the first chimpanzee, and third primate, to orbit the Earth Project Mercury; Mercury-Atlas series

Mercury-Atlas 5 was an American spaceflight of the Mercury program. It was launched on November 29, 1961, with Enos, a chimpanzee, aboard. The craft orbited the Earth twice and splashed down about 200 miles (320 km) south of Bermuda, and Enos became the first primate from the United States and the third great ape to orbit the Earth.

== History ==
By November 1961, the Soviet Union had launched Yuri Gagarin and Gherman Titov into orbit during the Vostok 1 and Vostok 2 crewed orbital flights while the United States had managed only suborbital ones. At that time NASA was still debating placing a chimpanzee in orbit as part of the Mercury-Atlas subprogram, with NASA headquarters questioning the wisdom of the Manned Spacecraft Center launching another uncrewed Mercury mission.

The NASA Public Affairs Office issued a press release prior to the flight, stating "The men in charge of Project Mercury have insisted on orbiting the chimpanzee as a necessary preliminary checkout of the entire Mercury program before risking a human astronaut."

== Launch and orbit ==
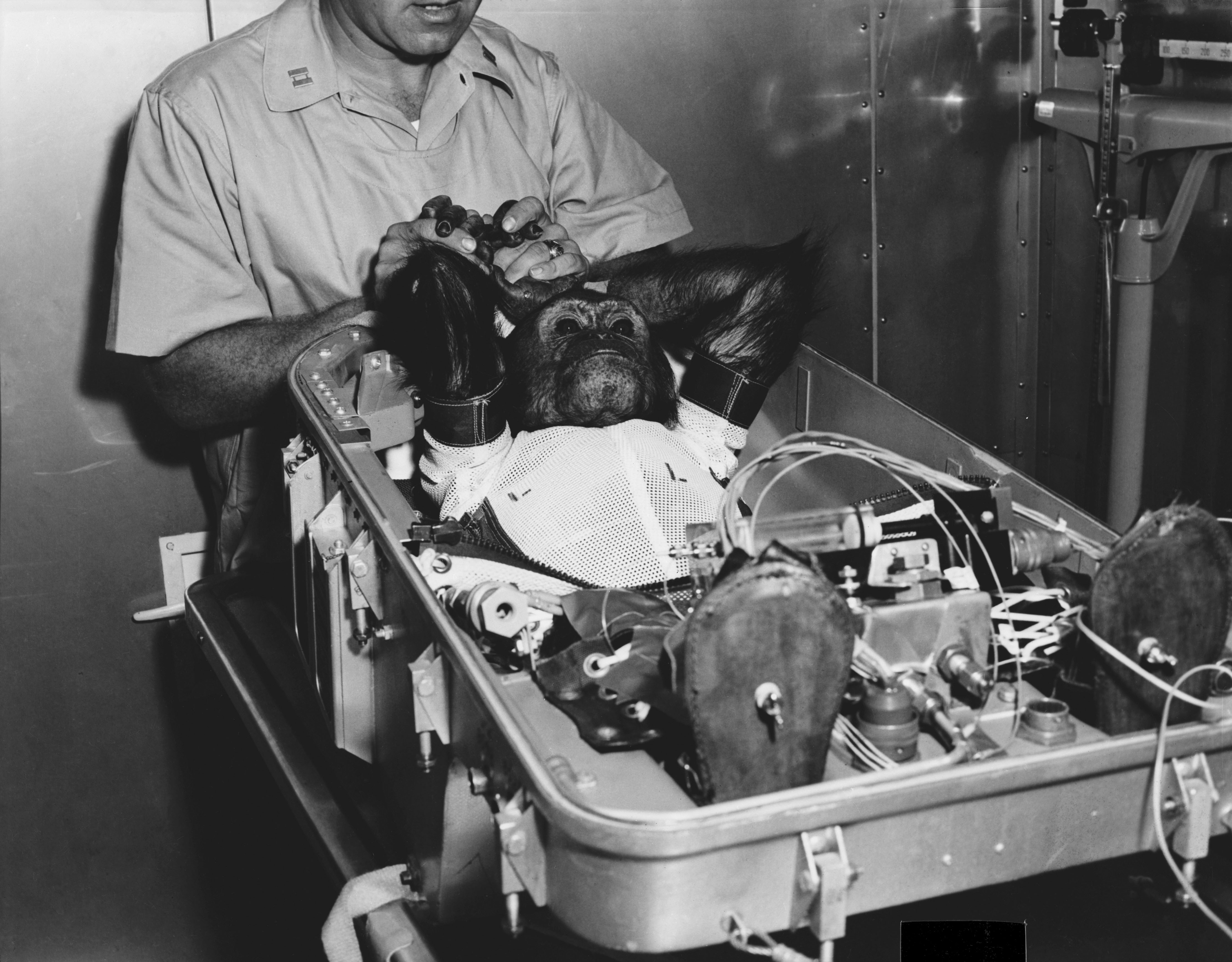
Enos in his flight couch, being prepared for insertion into his Mercury capsule

The flight used Mercury capsule #9 and Atlas #93-D. On February 24, 1961, spacecraft # 9 arrived at Cape Canaveral. It took 40 weeks of preflight preparation. This was the longest preparation time in the Mercury program. The mission of spacecraft #9 kept changing. It was first configured for a suborbital instrumented flight, then for a suborbital chimpanzee flight, then a three-orbit instrumented mission, and finally for the orbital flight that Enos flew.

MA-4's successful flight in September had renewed confidence in the Atlas's reliability. The Flight Safety Review Board met on November 28 to overview nine Atlas space and missile launches since the review board's last meeting in August. Four failures had been caused by an Atlas malfunction. Missile 26E lost sustainer thrust following (booster engine cutoff (BECO) on September 10 and the cause of that incident was still under investigation. MIDAS 4 and SAMOS 4 had experienced flight control system malfunctions and 32E had been destroyed shortly after launch on November 10 claiming the life of a squirrel monkey carried as part of a biological payload, but that mishap was due to a random quality control issue that would not affect the more tightly supervised Mercury program. The incidents on MIDAS 4 and SAMOS 4 were still under investigation.

Although MA-4 had performed well, there was still some concern about high vibration levels during the first 20 seconds of liftoff, so the autopilot on MA-5's booster was modified slightly to correct this problem.

Atlas 93D arrived at Cape Canaveral on August 12, 1961, and was erected on LC-14 on October 6. Prelaunch preparation proceeded relatively smoothly, with a number of minor repairs, including a potentially serious problem with the vernier engines not being bolted in place tightly which could have resulted in damage to the airframe during launch.

The range safety system on Atlas 93D was modified so that a manual cutoff command could be sent to the sustainer engine. This was to prevent the capsule from being accidentally boosted into a higher than planned orbit if engine over-acceleration occurred.

A more compact all-solid-state telemetry unit replaced the bulky vacuum tube-based package used previously.

Atlas 93D was the second D-series Atlas to contain the new SMRD (Spin Motor Rotation Detection System), designed to ensure proper gyroscope operation prior to launch.

MA-5 was planned as a close approximation of the upcoming MA-6 crewed orbital mission. Mercury-Atlas 5 would be launched from Complex 14 at Cape Canaveral on a heading 72.51 degrees east of north. Orbital insertion of the Mercury spacecraft would occur 480 miles (770 km) from Cape Canaveral. The altitude would be 100 miles (160 km) and the speed would be 25,695 feet per second (7,832 m/s). Retrofire was planned to take place at 4 hours, 32 minutes, and 26 seconds after launch. The spacecraft would land 21 minutes and 49 seconds after retrofire. Reentry temperatures were expected to reach 3,000 °F (1,650 °C) on the heatshield, 2,000 °F (1,090 °C) on the antenna housing, 1,080 °F (582 °C) on the cylindrical section, and 1,260 °F (682 °C) on the conical section. The spent Atlas sustainer engine was expected to reenter the atmosphere after 9⅓ orbits.

Spacecraft #9 had originally been intended to fly on MA-4, but Spacecraft #8 was used instead after having been recycled from the failed MA-3 launch. #9 was the second of the "Mark II" Mercury capsules with a larger square window and explosive bolt hatch, while the older "Mark I" capsule had small port windows and a heavy locking mechanism. Gus Grissom's flight on MR-4 had used a Mark II capsule, but it was necessary to test it on a proper orbital mission to ensure that the large window could handle the much higher heat of reentry there.

On October 29, 1961, three chimpanzees and 12 medical specialists moved into quarters at the Cape to prepare for the flight. The name given to Enos, the chimpanzee selected to fly the MA-5 mission, in Hebrew means "man". Enos's backups were (in order of possible call-up) Duane, Jim, Rocky, and Ham (the Mercury-Redstone 2 veteran). Enos was from Cameroon, Africa (originally called Chimp # 81), and was purchased by the USAF on April 3, 1960. He was about 5 years old at the time of flight and weighed just under 40 pounds (18 kilograms).

On November 29, 1961, about five hours before launch, Enos and his spacesuit-couch were inserted in the spacecraft. During the countdown, various holds took 2 hours and 38 minutes. Liftoff came at 15:08 UTC. The Atlas launched the MA-5 spacecraft into an orbit of 99 by 147 miles (159 by 237 km). The modified autopilot apparently worked as vibration remained within comfortable levels and the boost phase was uneventful. All Atlas systems performed excellently and there were no performance deviations of any significance. BECO occurred at T+130 seconds and sustainer engine cutoff (SECO)/VECO at T+300 seconds, followed by capsule separation two seconds later.

The turnaround and damping maneuver consumed 6 pounds (2.7 kg) of the 61.5 pounds (27.9 kg) of control fuel aboard. The spacecraft used less fuel than the MA-4 did during the same maneuver. MA-5 assumed its planned 34-degree orbital attitude and after that, through the first orbit the thrusters used only 1.5 pounds (0.68 kg) of fuel to maintain a correct position.

At the end of the first orbit, ground controllers noticed the capsule clock was 18 seconds too fast. As it passed over Cape Canaveral a command was sent to update the clock to the correct time. The Mercury Control Center at Cape Canaveral received information that all spacecraft systems were in good condition.

As the MA-5 passed over the Atlantic tracking ship at the beginning of the second orbit, indications were received that inverter temperatures were rising. The environmental control system malfunction was also confirmed by Canary Island trackers. Abnormal heating had occurred on earlier flights; in such cases, inverters had continued working or had been switched to standby. There was no alarm at Mercury Control. When the spacecraft reached Muchea, Australia, high thruster signals and capsule motion excursions were detected. Other data indicated that the 34° orbit mode was being maintained. When the MA-5 crossed the tracking station at Woomera, Australia, attitude control problems were not detected, so earlier reports were discounted.

=== Problems ===
As the MA-5 capsule reached the Canton Island station, Mercury Control realized that the attitude control system was malfunctioning. A metal chip in a fuel supply line had caused one of the clockwise roll thrusters to fail. The failed thruster allowed the spacecraft to drift from its normal attitude. This drift caused the automatic stabilization and control system to correct the spacecraft attitude. The spacecraft would swing back into the normal 34° orbital attitude, and the sequence would start again. The spacecraft repeated this drift and correction process nine times before retrofire. It did it once more between retrofire and the receipt of the 0.05 g (0.49 m/s²) light telemetry signal. The remaining thrusters used 9.5 pounds (4.3 kg) of fuel to keep the spacecraft properly aligned during the second orbit. Each loss of attitude cost over 1 pound (0.45 kg) of fuel as compared with the entire first orbit consumption of only 1.5 pounds (0.68 kg).

In addition to the attitude control problems, the environmental control system started having problems during the second orbit. The couch-suit circuit temperature rapidly rose from 65 to 80 °F (18 to 27 °C). This was an indication that the heat exchanger was freezing. The rise in suit temperature caused Enos' body temperature to rise to 99 °F (37 °C), then to 100 °F (38 °C). The medical observers began to worry about the chimpanzee's condition. At 100.5 °F (38.1 °C), his body temperature stabilized. This indicated that the environmental system had started to function again. The cooling system seemed to correct itself, but the attitude problems continued.

As the spacecraft neared Hawaii on its second orbit, medical monitors were willing to let Enos continue the flight for a third orbit. However, the engineering team were concerned about the stuck thruster causing high fuel consumption, so they advised terminating the flight before the capsule ran out of attitude control gas.

Flight Director Christopher Kraft alerted the Hawaii controllers to be ready to initiate retrofire to bring the spacecraft down in the Pacific, if necessary. He also alerted controllers at Point Arguello, California, to be ready to initiate retrofire as MA-5 passed over their position. He allowed the spacecraft to continue to its normal second orbit retrofire position near California. Twelve seconds before the retrofire point was reached for the normal second-orbit Atlantic primary recovery point, Kraft decided to bring Enos back to Earth. Arnold Aldrich, the chief flight controller at Point Arguello, executed the command.

There was one more attitude control excursion early in reentry; after that, the rest of reentry and recovery were uneventful. The destroyers USS Stormes and USS Compton and a P5M aircraft were waiting for the spacecraft at Station 8, the predicted landing point. Three hours and 13 minutes after launch and nine minutes before splashdown, the aircraft spotted the spacecraft at an altitude of 5,000 feet (1,500 m) descending on its main parachute, about 250 miles south of Bermuda. The information was relayed to Stormes and Compton, who were 30 miles (48 km) away. The spacecraft recovery aids were all functioning, except for the SARAH beacon. During the descent, the aircraft continued to circle and report landing events. It remained in the area until Stormes arrived, an hour and 15 minutes after the landing. Stormes hauled Enos and his spacecraft aboard. On the deck of Stormes, the MA-5 hatch was blown explosively. It was released from outside the capsule by pulling a lanyard. Blowing the hatch caused the spacecraft "picture" window to crack.

== Post-landing ==
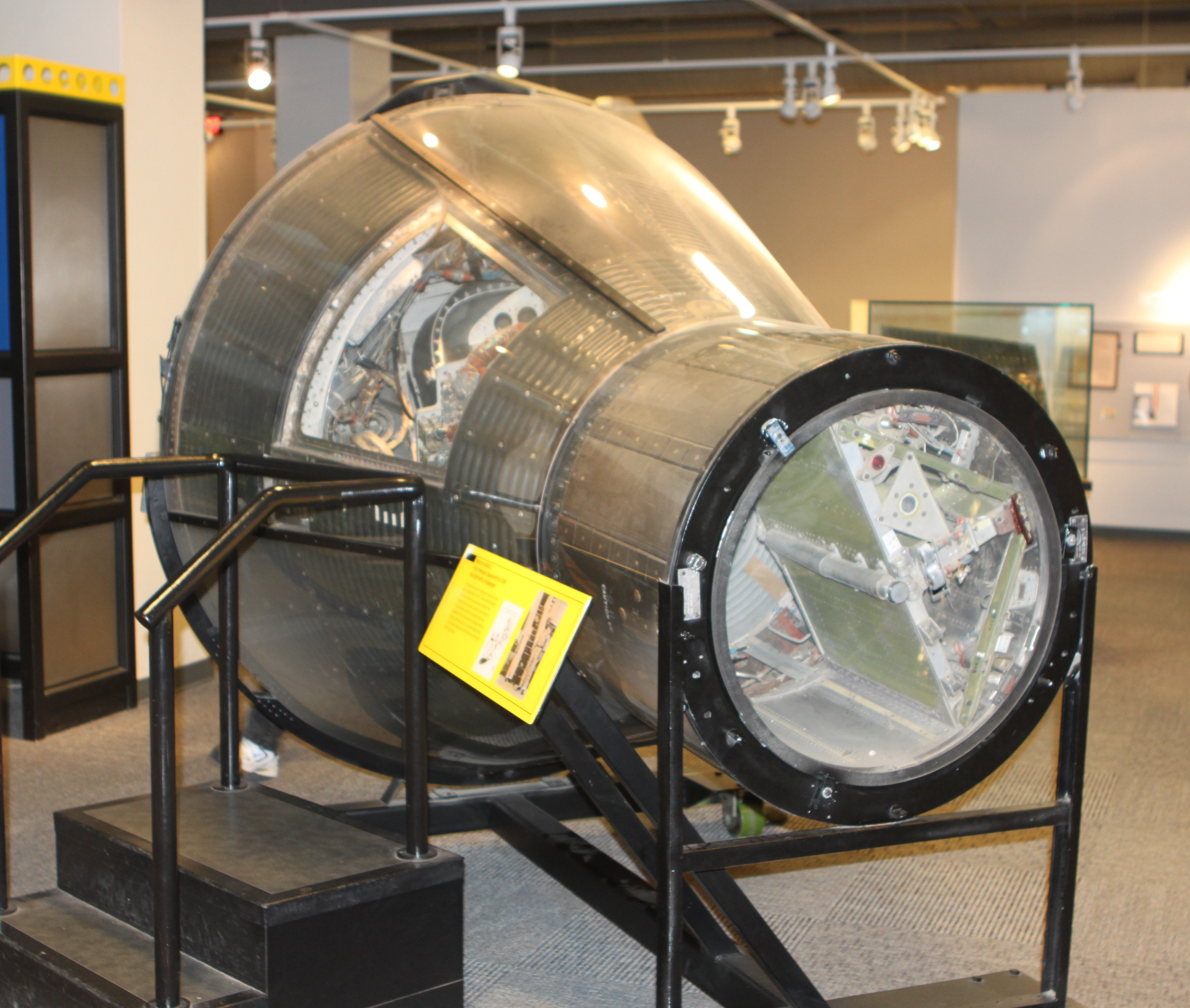
Mercury spacecraft # 9, used in the Mercury-Atlas 5 mission, on display at the Museum of Life and Science, in Durham, North Carolina.

The spacecraft and Enos were both found to have survived the mission in good condition, although the chimpanzee had removed all of the medical electrodes and the urine collection device from his body.

On November 4, 1962, Enos died of dysentery caused by shigellosis, which was resistant to antibiotics of the time. He had been under constant observation for two months before his death. Pathologists at Holloman reported that they found no symptom that could be attributed or related to his space flight a year before.

The Mercury spacecraft and Atlas booster had now been qualified to carry a human into orbit.

== See also ==
- Monkeys and apes in space
- Animals in space
- Splashdown
