= Mercury-Atlas 1 =

NASA test rocket (1960)

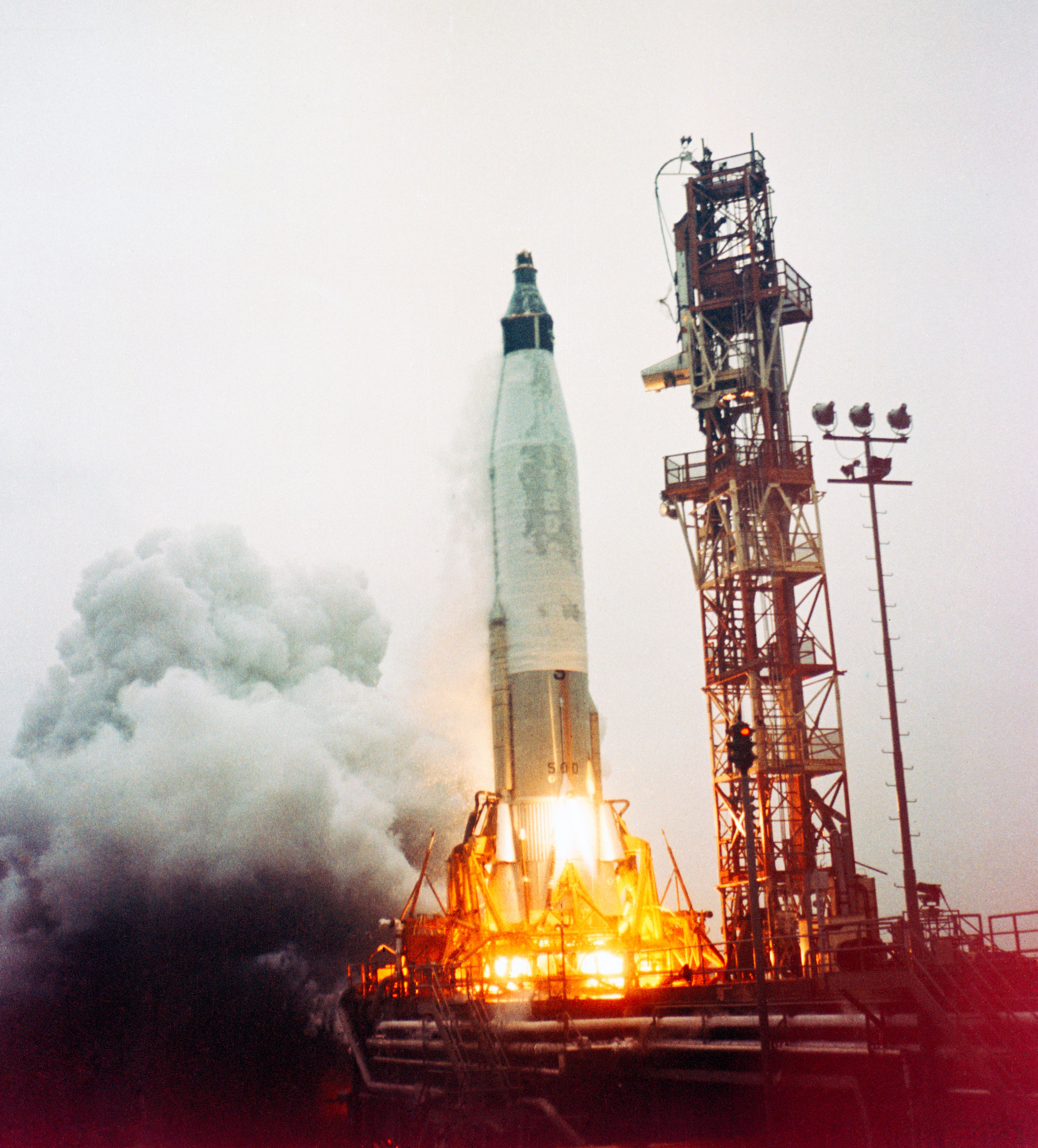
- MA-1 liftoff
- Mission type: Test flight
- Operator: NASA
- Mission duration: 3 minutes, 18 seconds Launch failure
- Distance travelled: 9.7 kilometres (6 mi)
- Apogee: 13.0 kilometres (8.1 mi)

Spacecraft properties
- Spacecraft: Mercury No.4
- Manufacturer: McDonnell Aircraft
- Launch mass: 1,154 kilograms (2,544 lb)

Start of mission
- Launch date: July 29, 1960, 13:13 UTC
- Rocket: Atlas LV-3B 50-D
- Launch site: Cape Canaveral LC-14
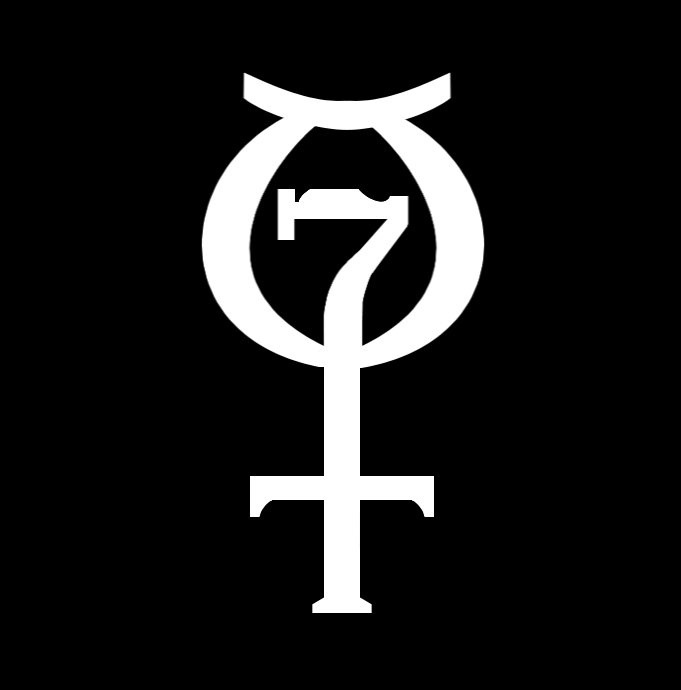
- Project Mercury; Mercury-Atlas series

Mercury-Atlas 1 (MA-1) was the first attempt to launch a Mercury capsule and occurred on July 29, 1960 at Cape Canaveral, Florida. The spacecraft was uncrewed and carried no launch escape system. The Atlas rocket suffered a structural failure 58 seconds after launch at an altitude of approximately 30,000 feet (9.1 km) and 11,000 feet (3.4 km) down range. All booster telemetry signals suddenly ceased as the vehicle was passing through Max Q. Because the day was rainy and overcast, the booster was out of sight from 26 seconds after launch, and it was impossible to see what happened.

The mission was to conduct a suborbital test flight and reentry of the spacecraft. The capsule carried live separation rockets, but dummy retrorockets. Several other systems were not installed, including the cabin pressurization system and the astronaut couch. A number of Mercury engineers had voiced their objection to the launch because the weather would prevent observation of the flight. Some witnesses claimed to have heard an explosion, but this could not be verified. The capsule continued transmitting until it impacted the ocean, approximately 6 miles (9.7 km) downrange. Salvage brought the capsule, Atlas booster engines and LOX vent valve to the surface from the ocean floor. The engines showed no sign of damage except some deformation from impact with the ocean, but the vent valve and a still-attached segment of piping had noticeable fatigue cracks.

== Investigation ==
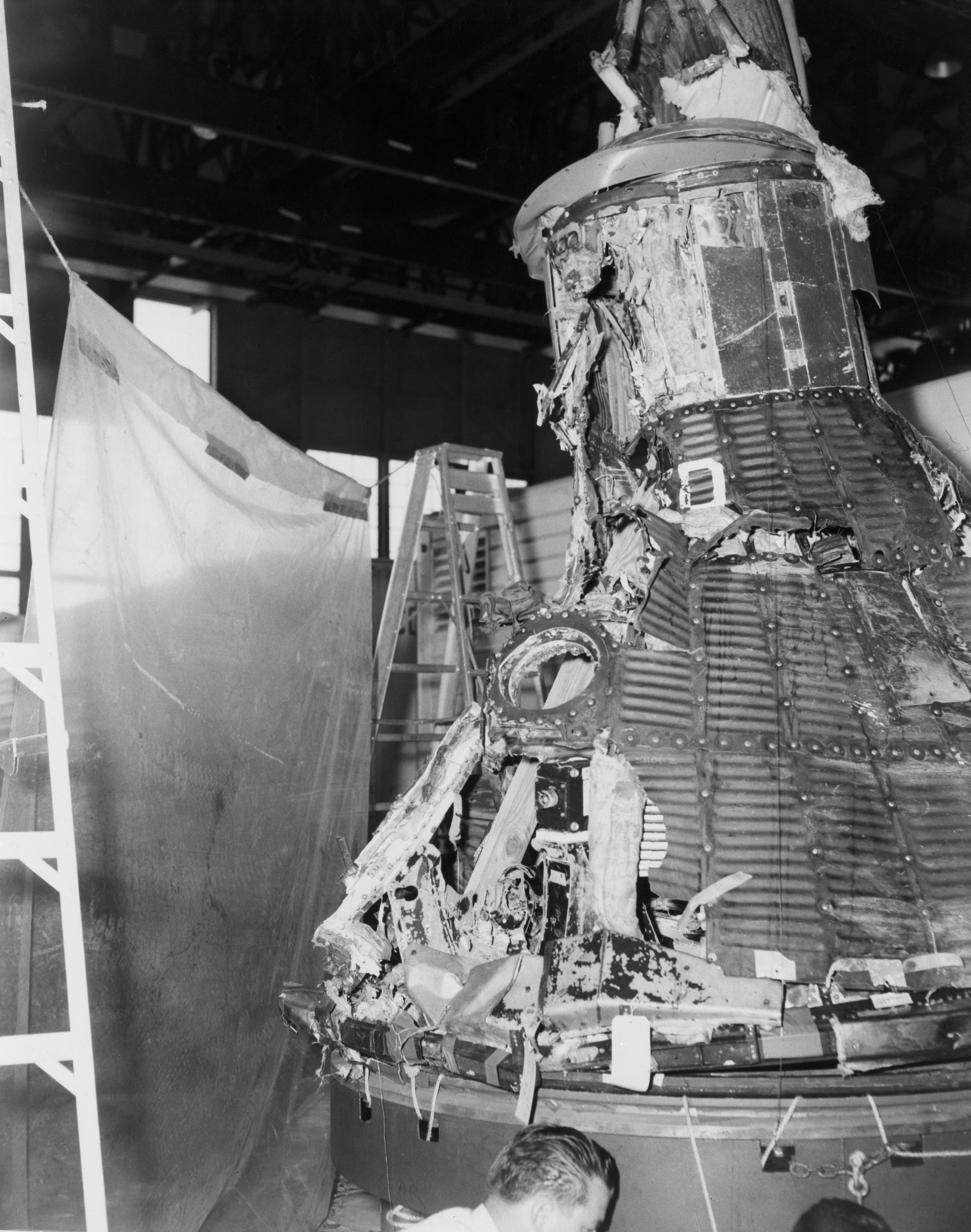
The reconstructed MA-1 spacecraft after debris recovery

Telemetry indicated that the Atlas functioned normally up to T+58 seconds and there was no sign of any problems up to that point, when a severe axial disturbance was detected. Approximately one second later, the pressure difference between the RP-1 and LOX tanks dropped to zero followed by loss of engine thrust and telemetry and the appearance of multiple objects on radar. Capsule data indicated violent movements following the loss of booster telemetry, but the Mercury otherwise continued functioning normally until impact with the ocean at around 220 seconds after launch. The automatic abort system appeared to have functioned correctly and issued a shutdown command to the Atlas's engines the moment that it detected an abnormal situation. The parachute system did not deploy because the abort had taken place too early in the launch. Unlike R&D Atlas D missiles, Atlas 50D was not carrying a large complement of telemetry probes; only 50 measurements were taken on this flight. The Atlas appeared to be on a steady flight path when telemetry was lost at T+60 seconds, but the last 1.2 seconds of telemetry data was questionable due to open circuits in the booster following the disturbance. The capsule gyroscope data suggested that the stack had pitched over as much as 10°. There had been two separate disturbances. The first one, at T+58.5 seconds, had caused the instant loss of telemetry measurements in the forward part of the booster. The second disturbance occurred at T+59.4 seconds, following the Abort Sensing and Implementation System (ASIS)-generated engine cutoff. The propulsion system did not appear to be affected by the initial event.

== Conclusions ==
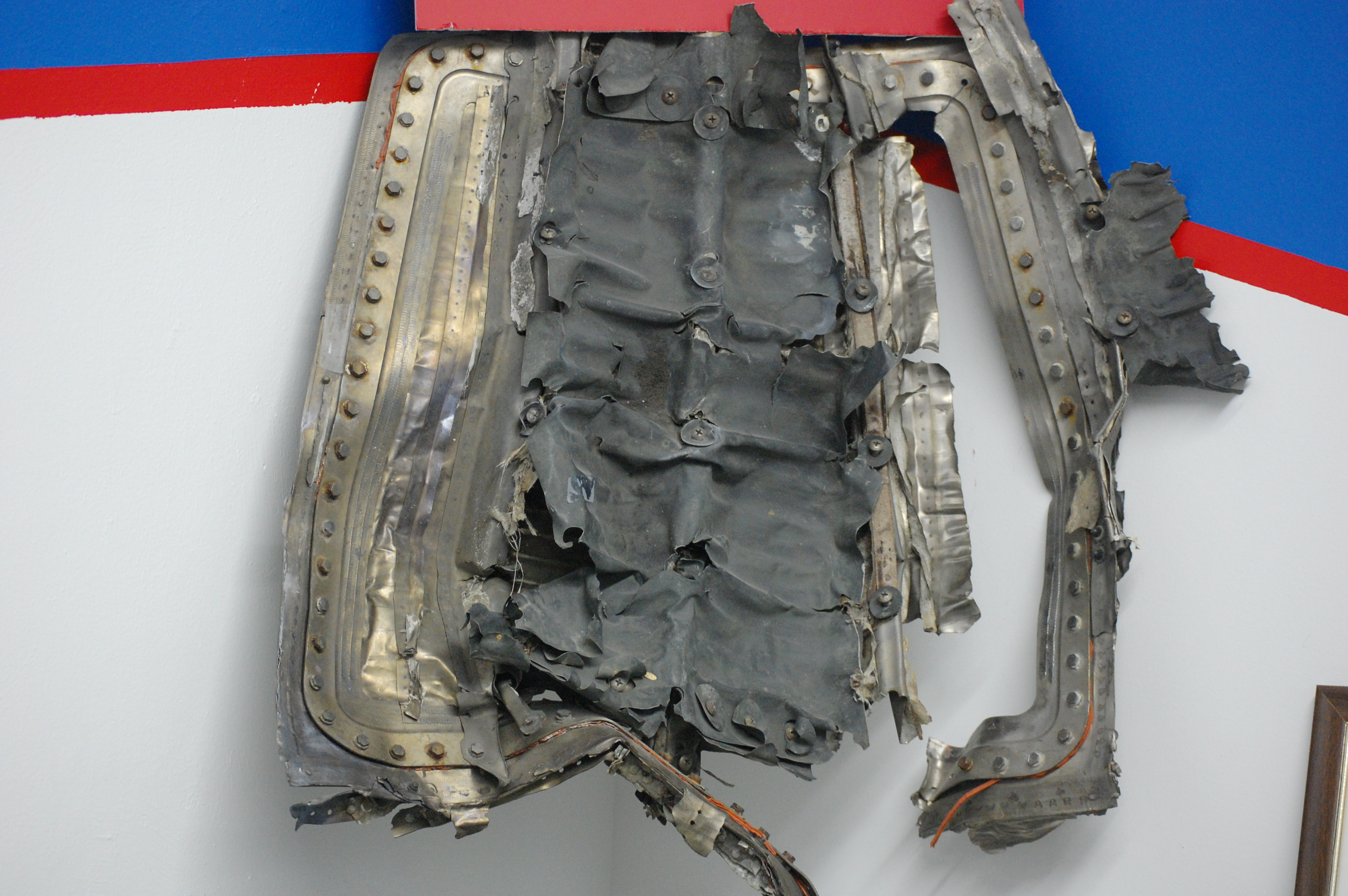
The hatch at the American Space Museum

The initial suspicion was that the fiberglass fairing placed on top of the capsule to sit in place of the absent LES had broken loose and punctured Atlas's LOX tank. NASA's Owen Maynard, who was involved in Mercury systems engineering, led the recovery of the MA-1 capsule from the sea floor (in which he performed a 30-foot (9.1 m) free-dive to find one particular missing component of the capsule). He stated in an oral history interview that his post-flight calculations showed the skin of the launch vehicle just below the spacecraft would have buckled due to the combined drag, acceleration, and bending loads which exceeded the resisting tensile stress in the skin provided by internal pressure. Maynard recalled that "The problem of mating the Mercury capsule to the Atlas was far from being properly resolved at the time of MA-1." Based on that finding, NASA specified that future Mercury-Atlas launch vehicles add doublers to the skin structure in that area, and that future launch trajectories be shallowed to reduce pitch angle rate, to reduce the bending stress on the launch vehicle. In fact, Atlas 50D already had slightly thicker skin than Big Joe's booster (Atlas 10D) but only on the RP-1 tank while the LOX tank still had the standard thin-gauge Atlas ICBM skin. This failure mode did not recur on those subsequent launches. There were also suspicions that the lack of a launch escape system had negatively affected the booster's aerodynamic profile. Convair engineers had argued that including the LES was necessary both from an aerodynamic standpoint and for data-gathering purposes, but Mercury program officials ultimately ruled against it.

The capsule reached an apogee of 13 kilometres (8.1 mi) and flew 9.6 kilometres (6.0 mi) downrange. The flight lasted 3 minutes and 18 seconds. Capsule weight 1,154 kilograms (2,544 lb). Serial numbers: Atlas 50-D, Mercury spacecraft #4.

Pieces of Mercury spacecraft #4, used in the Mercury-Atlas 1 mission, are currently displayed at the Cosmosphere in Hutchinson, Kansas. The hatch is at the American Space Museum in Titusville, Florida.
