= Mercury-Atlas 10 =

Cancelled American space mission

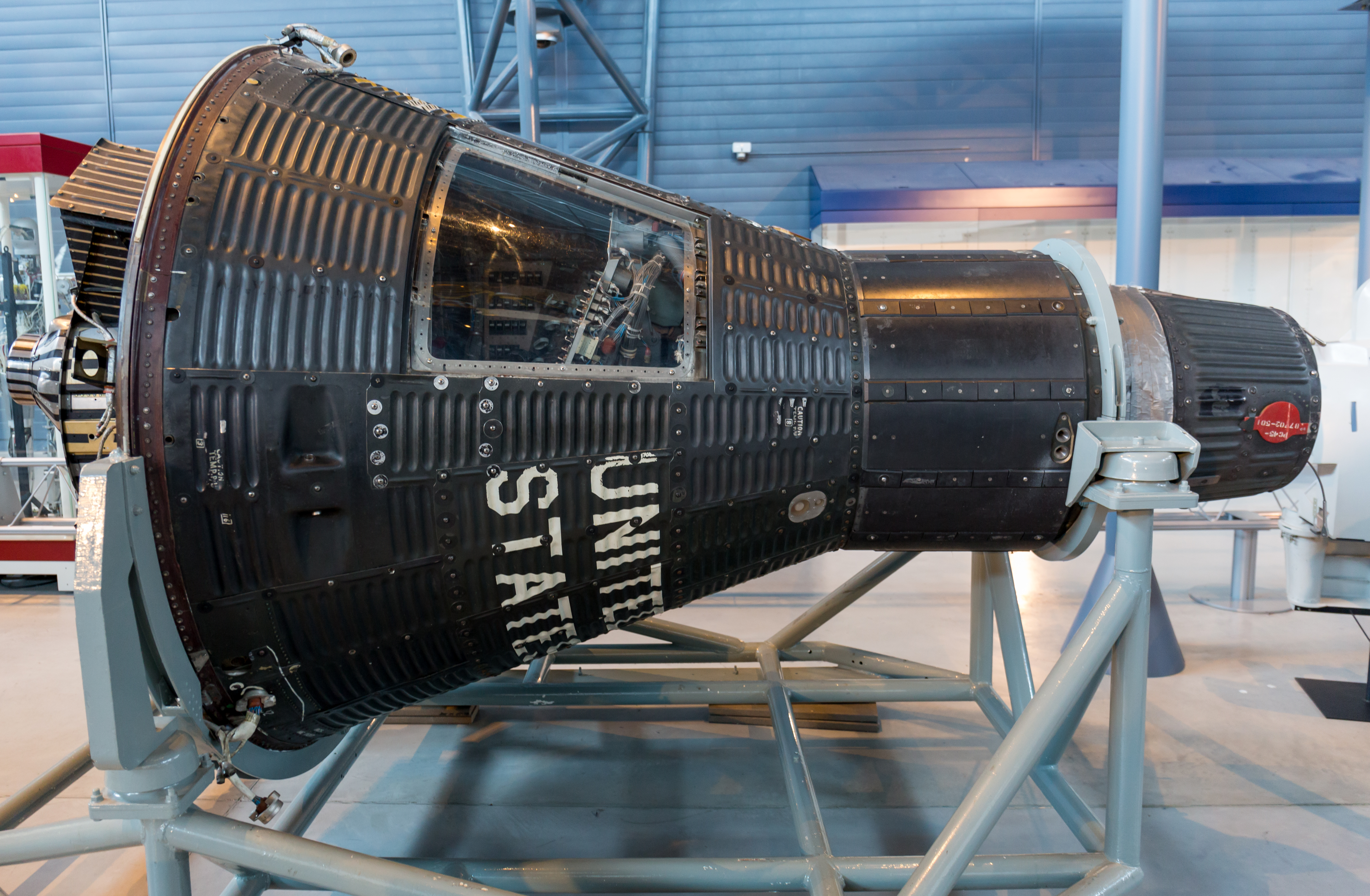
- Mission type: Test flight
- Operator: NASA
- Mission duration: 3 days (planned)

Spacecraft properties
- Spacecraft: Mercury No.15
- Manufacturer: McDonnell Aircraft
- Launch mass: ~1,490 kilograms (3,284 lb)

Crew
- Crew size: 1
- Members: Alan Shepard
- Callsign: Freedom 7 II

Start of mission
- Launch date: 1963 (cancelled)
- Rocket: Atlas LV-3B
- Launch site: Cape Canaveral LC-14
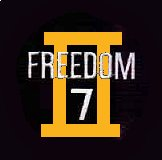

Mercury-Atlas 10 (MA-10) was a cancelled early crewed space mission, which would have been the last flight in NASA's Mercury program. It was planned as a three-day extended mission, to launch in late 1963; the spacecraft, Freedom 7-II, would have been flown by Alan Shepard, a veteran of the suborbital Mercury-Redstone 3 mission in 1961. However, it was cancelled after the success of the one-day Mercury-Atlas 9 mission in May 1963, to allow NASA to focus its efforts on the more advanced two-man Gemini program.

== Planning ==
Scheduling for the MA-10 mission began as early as mid-1961, before a single orbital flight had been flown. It was planned as a one-day orbital mission, using Spacecraft #15 and Atlas booster 144D. The - by now heavily modified - spacecraft #15A was delivered to Cape Canaveral on 16 November 1962, renumbered #15B in January 1963, and prepared for use as a backup spacecraft for MA-9; by this stage, NASA was noncommittal about whether or not a fifth orbital flight would be flown.

Shortly after the Mercury-Atlas 8 flight in October 1962, some commentators speculated on the possibility of MA-10 being flown as a "dual mission". In this approach, MA-10 and a new MA-11 flight, the latter using the MA-10 backup capsule, would be launched in close proximity, and fly a loosely co-ordinated mission, similar to the Soviet Vostok 3 and Vostok 4.

While in late 1962 the MA-10 mission had still been planned as a nominal one-day flight, as of early 1963, the tentative plan for the MA-10 mission anticipated it being around three days long. The mission was to be flown by Alan Shepard, the backup pilot for MA-9, then in preparation, and previously the pilot of the Mercury-Redstone 3 suborbital mission in 1961. In a nod to his earlier spacecraft, Shepard named #15B "Freedom 7-II".

The mission would have carried a re-entry communications experiment, which involved injecting water into the plasma sheath surrounding the spacecraft on reentry, in the hope that it would disrupt the sheath enough to allow radio communications; this was later flown on Gemini 3.

The backup astronaut for Shepard is unclear, but most likely would have been Gordon Cooper, as he was the only other astronaut who had not left the program entirely by mid-1963 or had moved to Gemini.

== Cancellation ==
By April, NASA had begun referring to MA-9 as the "culmination" of the program, and on 11 May NASA declared publicly that it was "absolutely beyond question" that a successful MA-9 flight would mean no MA-10. During the MA-9 postflight press conference on 19 May, Robert C. Seamans was asked about the possibility of a fifth orbital flight, and described it as "quite unlikely". President John F. Kennedy, when asked a similar question three days later, demurred, saying that the decision was one for NASA to make.

A meeting on 6 and 7 June debated carrying on to the MA-10 flight - or possibly beyond. The main argument put forward was that it would gain usable information for the Gemini and Apollo missions without needing a great deal of investment; the spacecraft and launch vehicles were available and almost ready for flight. Pressure had come from a more directly involved constituency as well; both NASA officials and the President himself had been lobbied by the "Mercury Seven" astronauts for a seventh Mercury mission.

Work continued on modifying Spacecraft #15B until 8 June, but on 12 June, the NASA Administrator, James E. Webb, stated publicly to the Senate Space Committee that there would be no further Mercury flights. All work ceased on the program, with personnel and resources reassigned to the Gemini and Apollo programs.

By the summer of 1963, it was obvious that continuing Mercury would sap resources needed for Gemini and Apollo. Despite the ambitious experiments planned for later Mercury missions, they would have run up against the tight payload capacity limits of the capsule and Atlas vehicle. The consumables needed for a three-day Mercury flight alone would have added 100 pounds (136 kilograms) of additional weight. In addition, the large number of malfunctions that occurred on Faith 7's flight drove home the fact that Mercury's hardware wasn't robust enough to stand a day-long mission, let alone multi-day. NASA officials disliked the lengthy gap between crewed missions that would result from this decision, and the first crewed Gemini mission ended up taking place in March 1965, twenty-two months after the end of Mercury and an even longer amount of time than originally expected.

Four Atlas boosters and Mercury capsules were in a state of partial completion when Mercury was cancelled. Although there was talk of using the leftover Atlases to launch Agena target vehicles for Gemini, the program's funding was eventually increased enough that NASA could afford to buy brand-new Atlases using the newer SLV-3 core.

The capsule was placed in storage, then later displayed at the Ames Research Center in California; it is now on display at the Smithsonian's Steven F. Udvar-Hazy Center in Chantilly, Virginia.
