= Mercury-Atlas 3 =

Unmanned spaceflight in 1961

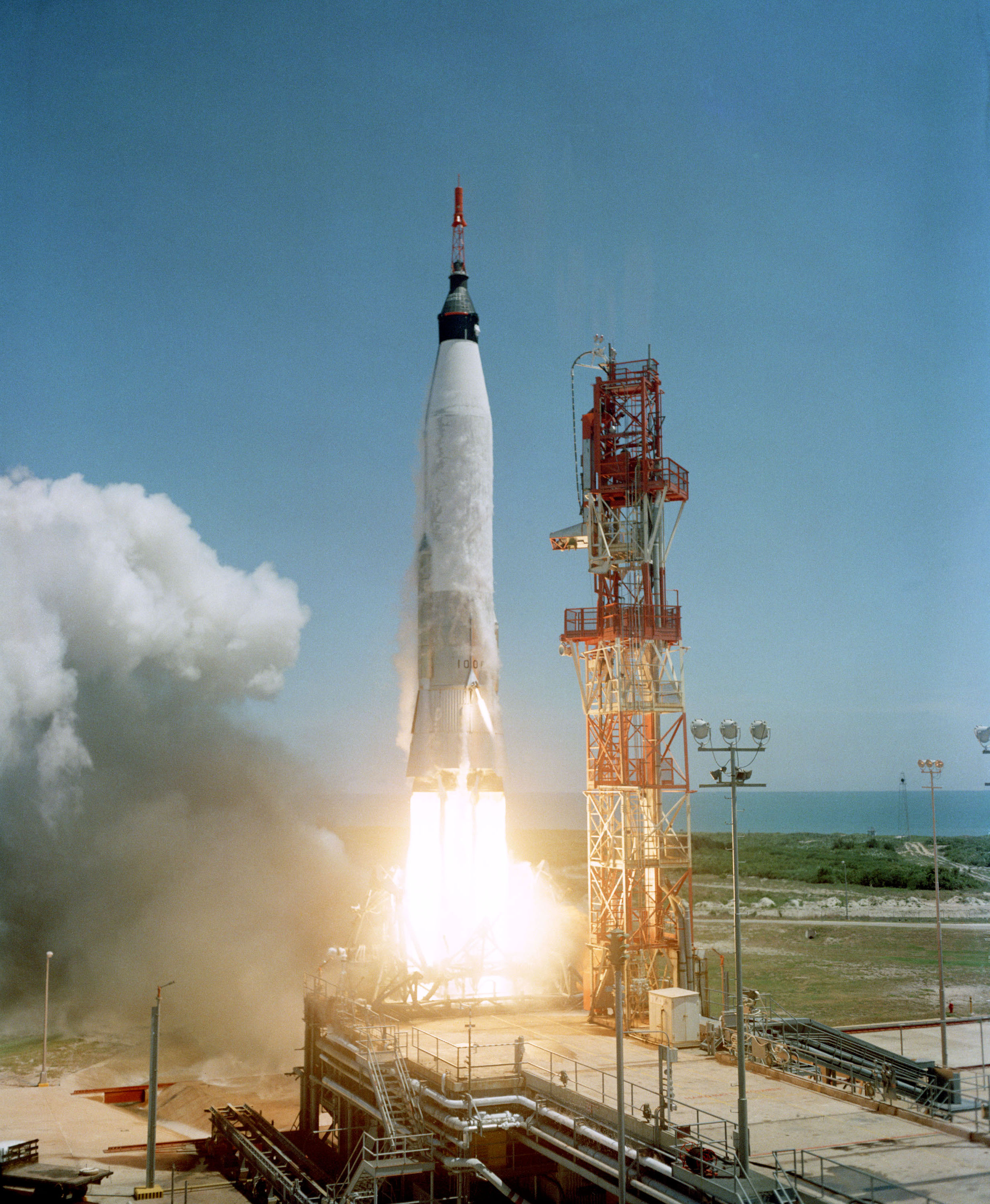
- Launch of MA-3
- Mission type: Test flight
- Operator: NASA
- Mission duration: 7 minutes, 19 seconds Failed to orbit
- Distance travelled: 1.8 kilometres (1.1 mi)
- Apogee: 7.2 kilometres (4.5 mi)

Spacecraft properties
- Spacecraft: Mercury No.8
- Manufacturer: McDonnell Aircraft
- Launch mass: 1,179 kilograms (2,599 lb)

Start of mission
- Launch date: April 25, 1961, 16:15 UTC
- Rocket: Atlas LV-3B 100-D
- Launch site: Cape Canaveral LC-14

End of mission
- Landing date: April 25, 1961, 16:23 UTC
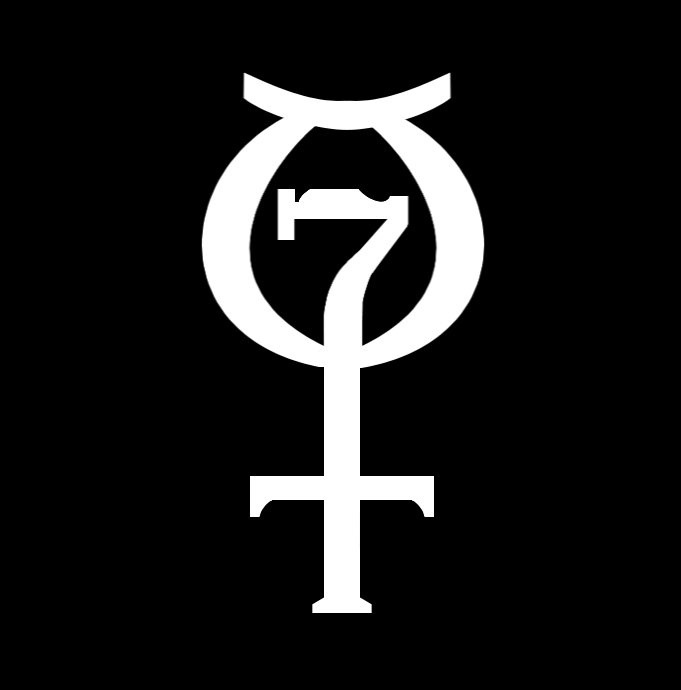
- Project Mercury; Mercury-Atlas series

Mercury-Atlas 3 (MA-3) was an unmanned spaceflight of the Mercury program. It was launched unmanned on April 25, 1961 at 16:15 UTC, from Launch Complex 14 at Cape Canaveral, Florida. The Mercury capsule contained a robotic "mechanical astronaut". Mercury spacecraft No. 8 and Atlas No. 8 100-D were used in the mission.

== Rocket ==
The Atlas used for the flight (Missile 100D) incorporated a number of technical improvements including thicker skin to handle the added weight of the Mercury capsule and prevent a recurrence of the Mercury-Atlas 1 failure. In addition, it sported a new, transistorized telemetry unit to replace the old-fashioned system used on previous Atlas vehicles which utilized vacuum tubes, was bulky, had high power consumption, and whose signal strength tended to degrade during launch. The revamped telemetry box had first been designed for the Atlas-Centaur and quickly adapted for the Mercury program.

== Flight ==
However, this flight would prove that the Atlas was still far from a reliable, man-rated booster. The launch proceeded normally until about T+20 seconds when the pitch and roll sequence failed to initiate and the vehicle instead just continued flying straight upward. As Mercury Flight Director Gene Kranz recalled, "Seconds after the launch, a note of anxiety crept into the Welsh accent of Tec Roberts, the flight dynamics officer (FIDO) responsible for launch and orbital trajectory control, as he reported, 'Flight, negative roll-and-pitch program.' A collective shudder went through everyone in the control room as the controllers absorbed the chilling significance of Roberts's terse report. The roll-and-pitch program normally changed the initial vertical trajectory of the launch into a more horizontal one that would take the Atlas out over the Atlantic. This Atlas was still inexplicably flying straight up, threatening the Cape and the surrounding communities. The worst-case scenario would be for it to pitch back toward land or explode. The higher it flew before it exploded, the wider the 'footprint' of debris scattered all over the Cape and surrounding area would be. The RSO (range safety officer) monitoring the launch confirmed the lack of a roll-and-pitch program, then continued to give the Atlas an opportunity to recover and start its track across the Atlantic. The RSO lifted the cover on the command button and watched as the Atlas raced to a fatal convergence with the limits on his plot board. At forty-three seconds after liftoff, Roberts reported, 'The range safety officer has transmitted the destruct command.' We waited, not speaking, counting the seconds, listening for the telltale, muffled krump that would signal the mission was over. Carl Huss, the retro controller (RETRO), responsible for reentry trajectory planning and operations, reported, 'Radar tracking multiple targets.' Roberts's response echoed all our feelings: 'Chris, I'm sorry.' We sat by the consoles, not talking for several seconds. Then, one by one, the controllers closed their countdown books and started to pack their documents."

Only 43 seconds after liftoff, Mercury-Atlas 3's mission ended in a rain of fiery debris falling back to Earth. The escape tower activated the moment the destruct command was sent and lofted Mercury spacecraft #8 to safety. The capsule flew to an apogee of 7.2 km and downrange only 1.8 km. The flight of the Mercury capsule lasted 7 minutes and 19 seconds, most of that time descending on its parachute. The spacecraft was recovered some 20 minutes after launch in the Atlantic Ocean by a US Marine CH-37 helicopter and reused on the next flight (Mercury-Atlas 4) as spacecraft No. 8A. One comforting fact to the Mercury team was that the flight verified the reliability of the launch escape system. This was the first Mercury-Atlas launch with a live escape tower.

== Aftermath ==
Investigation of telemetry data quickly narrowed the cause of the failure to a fault somewhere in the guidance system, but the exact nature of it could not be determined. It appeared that the missile programmer either shut off completely shortly after liftoff or suffered a power outage, restarted, and then failed to execute the pitch and roll sequence. Two months after the MA-3 flight, the Atlas's programmer was discovered buried in mud on a beach not far from the launch pad and examined. The exact cause of the failure was not determined with certainty, but several possible causes were proposed, including contamination of pins in the programmer or a transient voltage that had caused the programmer to reset itself. The programmer on the whole was found to have several serious design flaws that required correction.
