= Mercury-Atlas =

Project Mercury subprogram using the Atlas LV-3B launch vehicle (1960-1963)

Atlas MA-9

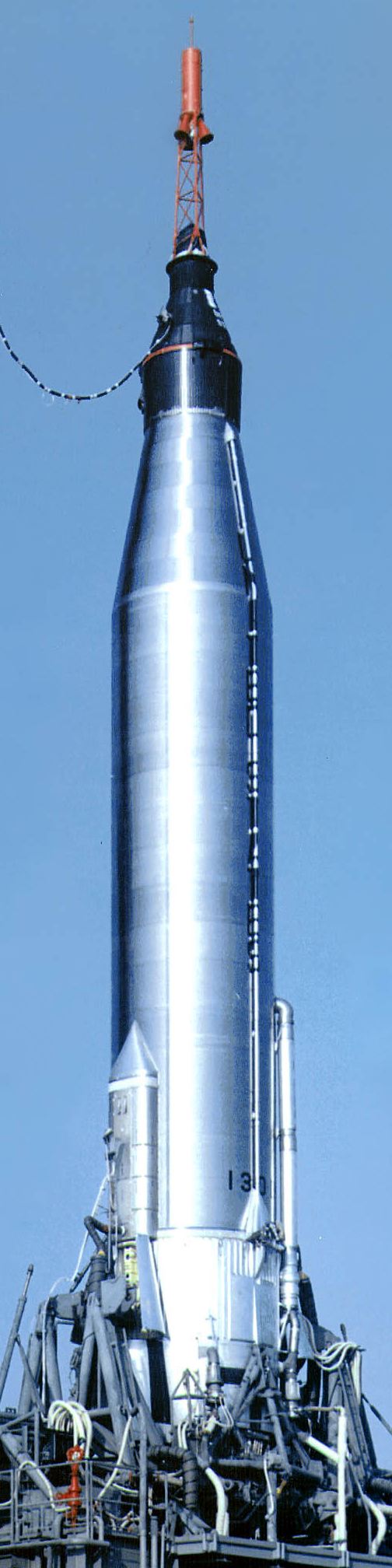
Last crewed Mercury-Atlas

Mercury-Atlas was a subprogram of Project Mercury that included most of the flights and tests using the Atlas LV-3B launch vehicle. The Atlas was also used for one Mercury flight under the Big Joe subprogram.

The Mercury mission numbering system was: a two-letter designation marking the launch vehicle type, followed by a dash, then a number designating the flight/test number. The Atlas launch vehicles used for Project Mercury were given a two- or three-digit number followed by a "-D", indicating that they were the "D" version of the Atlas.

The missions flown in Mercury-Atlas were:

- MA-1 using Atlas launch vehicle "50-D"
- MA-2 using Atlas launch vehicle "67-D"
- MA-3 using Atlas launch vehicle "100-D"
- MA-4 using Atlas launch vehicle "88-D"
- MA-5 using Atlas launch vehicle "93-D"
- MA-6 using Atlas launch vehicle "109-D"
- MA-7 using Atlas launch vehicle "107-D"
- MA-8 using Atlas launch vehicle "113-D"
- MA-9 using Atlas launch vehicle "130-D"

== See also ==
- Atlas (rocket family)
