= MA9 =

MA-9 may refer to:

- Massachusetts's 9th congressional district
- Massachusetts Route 9
- Mercury-Atlas 9, a spaceflight of Project Mercury
