= Cape Canaveral Launch Complex 14 =

Launch site of manned Project Mercury flights

Launch Complex 14
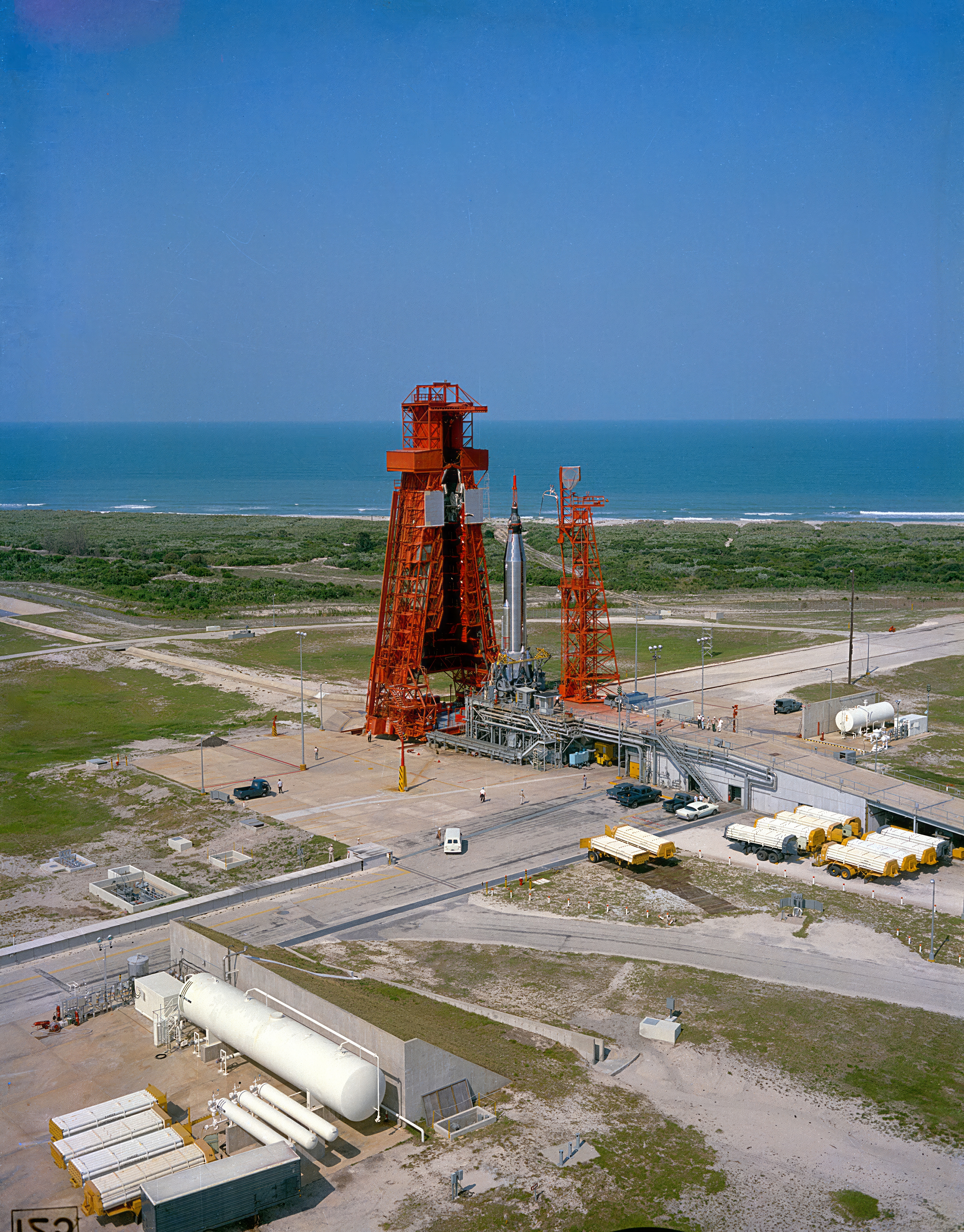
- Aerial view of Mercury-Atlas 9 at LC-14 in 1963
- Interactive map of Launch Complex 14
- Launch site: Cape Canaveral Space Force Station
- Location: 28°29′28″N 80°32′49″W
- Time zone: UTC−05:00 (EST)
  - Summer (DST): UTC−04:00 (EDT)
- Short name: LC-14
- Operator: United States Space Force (owner); Stoke Space (tenant)
- Total launches: 32
- Launch pad: 1
- Orbital inclination range: 28° – 57°
Launch history
- Status: Awaiting rocket activation
- First launch: 11 June 1957; Atlas A
- Last launch: 11 November 1966; Atlas-Agena / Gemini 12 GATV
- Associated rockets: Future: Nova; Retired: SM-65 Atlas, Atlas-Able, Atlas-Agena, Mercury-Atlas

Launch Complex 14 (LC-14) is a launch site at Cape Canaveral Space Force Station in Florida. Part of the Missile Row lineup of launch sites in the region, LC-14 was used for various crewed and uncrewed Atlas launches, including the February 1962 Friendship 7 flight aboard which John Glenn became the first American to orbit the Earth.

LC-14 is currently leased to Stoke Space for their Nova launch vehicle.

== History ==
=== Atlas and Mercury ===
LC-14 was the first Atlas pad in operation and hosted the initial Atlas A and B test flights in 1957-58 It was also the only one of the original four pads to never have a booster explode on it. By 1959, it was decided to convert the pad for Atlas D missile and space launches, and a large service tower was added early in the year. The first Atlas flown from the renovated LC-14 was Missile 7D on May 18; however, a problem with the launcher hold-down arms damaged the missile and caused its explosion shortly after launch. This was traced to improper procedures during the renovation of the pad and was quickly fixed. The first space launch off LC-14 was the Big Joe Mercury test in September. As the designated Mercury-Atlas facility, LC-14 was thus the only Atlas pad having the infrastructure needed for crewed launches. The first MIDAS satellites, one Atlas-Able launch, and a few more ICBM tests were conducted from LC-14 before it was completely turned over to NASA.

LC-14 is most well known as the launch site for NASA's Mercury-Atlas 6 flight, which made Glenn the first American in orbit. It was also the launch site of the remaining three Mercury-Atlas flights and various uncrewed Atlas launches. Later, it was the site for Atlas-Agena launches for the Agena Target Vehicles for Project Gemini.

Following decommissioning and abandonment as an active launch site, LC-14 slowly fell into decay. The proximity to salty ocean air created an ideal environment for corrosion of metal components, and the complex's red metal gantry structures were dismantled for safety reasons during the 1970s.

=== Restoration ===
In 1997, the 45th Space Wing embarked on a partial restoration of LC-14 under the aegis of the 45th Operations Support Squadron and its commander, Lt Col Dennis Hilley, USAF. Although extensive repairs were made by Boeing and Johnson Controls, with additional assistance from Lockheed Martin and Brown and Root, the restoration utilized no military construction or military operations and maintenance funding and was affected strictly with military, DoD civilian, NASA civilian, DoD contractor and NASA contractor volunteers. Several months later, the exterior and interior of the original blockhouse and its nearby astronaut parking area had been restored, with the blockhouse converted into a conference facility for military, NASA and contractor use.

Present at the dedication in May 1998 were former Mercury astronauts Colonel Gordon Cooper, USAF (Ret.) and Commander Scott Carpenter, USN (Ret.); Mrs. Betty Grissom, widow of Lt Col Gus Grissom, USAF; and comedian Bill Dana, known for his "José Jiménez, the reluctant astronaut" character. Appearing periodically on The Ed Sullivan Show in the 1960s, the character caught on as a subject of humor among the seven Mercury astronauts.

Among other Mercury astronauts, former U.S. Senator (and Colonel, USMC (Ret.)) John Glenn could not attend due to preparations for his then-pending Space Shuttle flight (STS-95), and Captain Wally Schirra, USN (Ret.) could not attend due to a scheduling conflict. Deke Slayton had died in 1993, while Rear Admiral Alan Shepard, USN (Ret.) extended his regrets due to illness. Largely unknown at the time was that Shepard was suffering from terminal leukemia, and he died shortly after the dedication.

In addition to the total interior renovation, the blockhouse contains historical documents, photos and memorabilia from Project Mercury, as well as photos of the blockhouse area before, during and after the restoration. Future improvements to the pad itself are also planned as time and contributory funding permits.

The entrance road to LC-14 is marked by several memorials and signs commemorating Project Mercury and the four of six crewed Mercury missions launched there. This includes a large sculpture of the Project Mercury symbol constructed of titanium, under which is buried a time capsule containing technical documents of the Mercury program. The time capsule is scheduled to be opened in 2464, 500 years after the official conclusion of the program. With its withdrawal from operational status, a memorial marker in granite was also placed at the beginning of the concrete ramp that leads to LC-14's launch pad and two outdoor kiosks were erected to contain historical photos.

=== Use by Stoke Space ===
On March 7, 2023, Stoke Space was allocated the launch complex for their upcoming fully reusable Nova launch vehicle. Space Launch Delta 45 of the U.S. Space Force made the decision to optimize the use of excess launch property and the Eastern Range along Florida's coastline.

Construction began on October 21, 2024, following an environmental assessment. The pad was completed in early 2026, with the first launch from the pad targeted for 2027.

== Launch history ==
Launch sites at Cape Canaveral Space Force Station and Kennedy Space Center
Active pads
Inactive leased pads
Inactive unleased pads
Repurposed pads, not used for launches
1 LC-39B
2 LC-39A
3 LC-48
4 SLC-41
5 SLC-40
6 LC-47
7 SLC-37
8 LC-34
9 SLC-20
10 LC-19
11 LC-16
12 LC-15
13 LC-14
14 LC-13 (LZ-2)
15 LC-12
16 LC-11
17 LC-36
18 LC-1, LC-2, LC-3, and LC-4
19 SLC-46
20 LC-21 and LC-22
21 LC-31 and LC-32
22 LC-18
23 SLC-17
24 LC-26
25 LC-5 and LC-6
26 LC-30
27 LC-25
28 LC-29

=== Statistics ===
- Atlas
- Atlas-Able
- Atlas-Agena
- Mercury-Atlas
- Stoke Space Nova

=== List of launches ===
All missile tests and MIDAS launches operated by the United States Air Force. All other flights operated by NASA.

No.	Date	Time (UTC)	Launch Vehicle	Configuration	Mission/Payload	Result	Remarks
1	11 June 1957	19:37	SM-65 Atlas	Atlas A	Suborbital test	Failure	First launch from LC-14, maiden flight of the SM-65 Atlas, and first flight of the Atlas rocket family. Premature engine shutdown 50 seconds into flight activated range safety protocols.
2	25 September 1957	19:57	SM-65 Atlas	Atlas A	Suborbital test	Failure	Premature engine shutdown 63 seconds into flight activated range safety protocols.
3	17 December 1957	17:39	SM-65 Atlas	Atlas A	Suborbital test	Success	First successful launch from LC-14.
4	7 February 1958	19:37	SM-65 Atlas	Atlas A	Suborbital test	Failure	Vernier engine failure led to engine shutdown and tumble 164 seconds into flight, leading to range safety protocols.
5	5 April 1958	17:01	SM-65 Atlas	Atlas A	Suborbital test	Failure	Turbopump failed 105 seconds into flight. Range safety not activated, and missile impacted the ocean in one piece. Final Atlas A launch from LC-14.
6	14 September 1958	05:24	SM-65 Atlas	Atlas B	Suborbital test	Success	First Atlas B launch from LC-14.
7	29 November 1958	02:27	SM-65 Atlas	Atlas B	Suborbital test	Success	
8	16 January 1959	04:00	SM-65 Atlas	Atlas B	Suborbital test	Failure	Unknown control difficulties led to engine shutdown 121 seconds into flight. Final Atlas B launch from LC-14.
9	19 May 1959	04:30	SM-65 Atlas	Atlas D	Suborbital test	Failure	First Atlas D launch from LC-14. Missile damaged at liftoff by hold-down arm, leading to pressurization failure 64 seconds into flight and range safety protocols.
10	9 September 1959	08:19	Mercury-Atlas	Atlas D	Big Joe 1	Partial failure	Suborbital launch. First civilian launch and first Project Mercury flight from LC-14. Carried a boilerplate Mercury capsule. Faulty electrical contacts led to booster jettison failure and limitation of range. Capsule successfully recovered.
11	26 November 1959	07:26	Atlas-Able	Atlas D / Able	Pioneer P-3	Failure	Part of the Pioneer program, aimed at exploring the Moon. First orbital attempt from LC-14 and only one so far beyond low Earth orbit. Maiden flight of the Atlas Able, and only flight from LC-14. Payload fairing separated 45 seconds into flight, leading to vehicle breakup.
12	26 February 1960	17:25	Atlas-Agena	Atlas LV-3 / Agena-A	MIDAS 1	Failure	Part of the Missile Defense Alarm System series of early warning satellites. Maiden flight of the Atlas-Agena. Staging issue damaged RM-81 Agena, causing failure to achieve orbit.
13	24 May 1960	17:36	Atlas-Agena	Atlas LV-3 / Agena-A	MIDAS 2	Success	Part of the Missile Defense Alarm System series of early warning satellites. First successful Atlas-Agena flight, and first successful orbital launch from LC-14.
14	22 June 1960	14:49	SM-65 Atlas	Atlas D	Suborbital test	Success	
15	29 July 1960	13:13	Mercury-Atlas	Atlas LV-3B / Mercury	Mercury-Atlas 1	Failure	Suborbital launch. First flight of an operational Mercury capsule, designed to test reentry. Contained no launch escape system. Rocket suffered structural failure during max q 58 seconds into launch.
16	19 September 1960	18:31	SM-65 Atlas	Atlas D	Suborbital test	Success	
17	22 October 1960	05:13	SM-65 Atlas	Atlas D	Suborbital test	Success	Final military launch from LC-14.
18	21 February 1961	14:12	Mercury-Atlas	Atlas LV-3B / Mercury	Mercury-Atlas 2	Success	Suborbital launch. Reflight of MA-1's objectives, but with added launch escape tower.
19	25 April 1961	16:15	Mercury-Atlas	Atlas LV-3B / Mercury	Mercury-Atlas 3	Failure	First orbital attempt for a Mercury capsule. Contained crewman simulator. Guidance failure led to breakup 43 seconds after launch. Launch escape system activated and capsule was successfully recovered.
20	13 September 1961	14:04	Mercury-Atlas	Atlas LV-3B / Mercury	Mercury-Atlas 4	Success	Reflight of MA-3. Contained crewman simulator. Completed one orbit around Earth before reentering and splashing down. First orbital flight for Project Mercury.
21	29 November 1961	15:07	Mercury-Atlas	Atlas LV-3B / Mercury	Mercury-Atlas 5	Success	Carried chimpanzee Enos into LEO, becoming the first live animal from the United States to reach orbit. Completed two orbits before reentering.
22	20 February 1962	14:47	Mercury-Atlas	Atlas LV-3B / Mercury	Mercury-Atlas 6 (Friendship 7)	Success	First crewed orbital flight from the United States, first crewed launch on an Atlas, and first crewed launch from LC-14. Carried astronaut John Glenn into three orbits before successfully returning to Earth. Third crewed launch of Project Mercury, following Mercury-Redstone 3 and MR-4 the previous year.
23	24 May 1962	12:45	Mercury-Atlas	Atlas LV-3B / Mercury	Mercury-Atlas 7 (Aurora 7)	Success	Second of four crewed orbital flights of Mercury-Atlas. Carried astronaut Scott Carpenter into orbit. Human error in retrograde burn led to off-course splashdown. Originally slated to carry astronaut Deke Slayton before atrial fibrillation diagnosis grounded him.
24	3 October 1962	12:15	Mercury-Atlas	Atlas LV-3B / Mercury	Mercury-Atlas 8 (Sigma 7)	Success	Third of four crewed flights of Mercury-Atlas. Carried astronaut Wally Schirra into orbit. Completed six orbits before reentering.
25	15 May 1963	13:04	Mercury-Atlas	Atlas LV-3B / Mercury	Mercury-Atlas 9 (Faith 7)	Success	Fourth and final of four crewed flights of Mercury-Atlas. Carried astronaut Gordon Cooper into orbit, completing 22 orbits over 34 hours before returning to Earth. Last crewed launch of an Atlas rocket until Boeing CFT in 2024, and most recent crewed launch from LC-14. Last flight of Project Mercury and most recent solo American orbital mission.
26	25 October 1965	15:00	Atlas-Agena	Atlas SLV-3 / Agena-D	Gemini 6 ATV	Failure	First launch of the Agena Target Vehicle, tasked with docking with Gemini 6. First flight from LC-14 for Project Gemini. Vehicle breakup following ignition of Agena six minutes into flight. Gemini 6 mission reorganized into Gemini 6A to rendezvous with Gemini 7.
27	16 March 1966	15:00	Atlas-Agena	Atlas SLV-3 / Agena-D	Gemini 8 ATV	Success	ATV launch, tasked with docking with Gemini 8. First successful launch of the ATV, and participated in first ever spacecraft docking. Mission cut short and aborted after thruster failure on Gemini caused spacecraft to tumble. Was later visited by Gemini 10.
28	17 May 1966	15:15	Atlas-Agena	Atlas SLV-3 / Agena-D	Gemini 9 ATV	Failure	ATV launch, tasked with docking with Gemini 9. Vehicle went into unplanned pitch prior to booster engine cutoff, causing impact into the Atlantic. Gemini 9 mission reorganized into Gemini 9A to rendezvous and dock with ATDA.
29	1 June 1966	15:00	Atlas SLV-3	Atlas SLV-3 / ATDA	Gemini 9A ATDA	Partial failure	Only launch of ATDA, tasked with docking with Gemini 9A. Fairing failed to jettison, leading to docking being aborted during rendezvous and mission to be cut early.
30	18 July 1966	20:39	Atlas-Agena	Atlas SLV-3 / Agena-D	Gemini 10 ATV	Success	ATV launch, tasked with docking with Gemini 10. First fully successful ATV mission, and performed first burn of a spacecraft while docked.
31	12 September 1966	13:05	Atlas-Agena	Atlas SLV-3 / Agena-D	Gemini 11 ATV	Success	ATV launch, tasked with docking with Gemini 11. Was target in first direct-ascent rendezvous. Participated in first test of artificial gravity in space, using a tether between it and the Gemini spacecraft. Set a non-Apollo crewed altitude record of 1,374 km that lasted until Polaris Dawn in 2024.
32	11 November 1966	19:07	Atlas-Agena	Atlas SLV-3 / Agena-D	Gemini 12 ATV	Success	ATV launch, tasked with docking with Gemini 12. Orbital boost was cancelled due to engine problem after insertion into LEO. Final flight of the ATV, and final mission of Project Gemini. Most recent launch from LC-14.

== Gallery ==
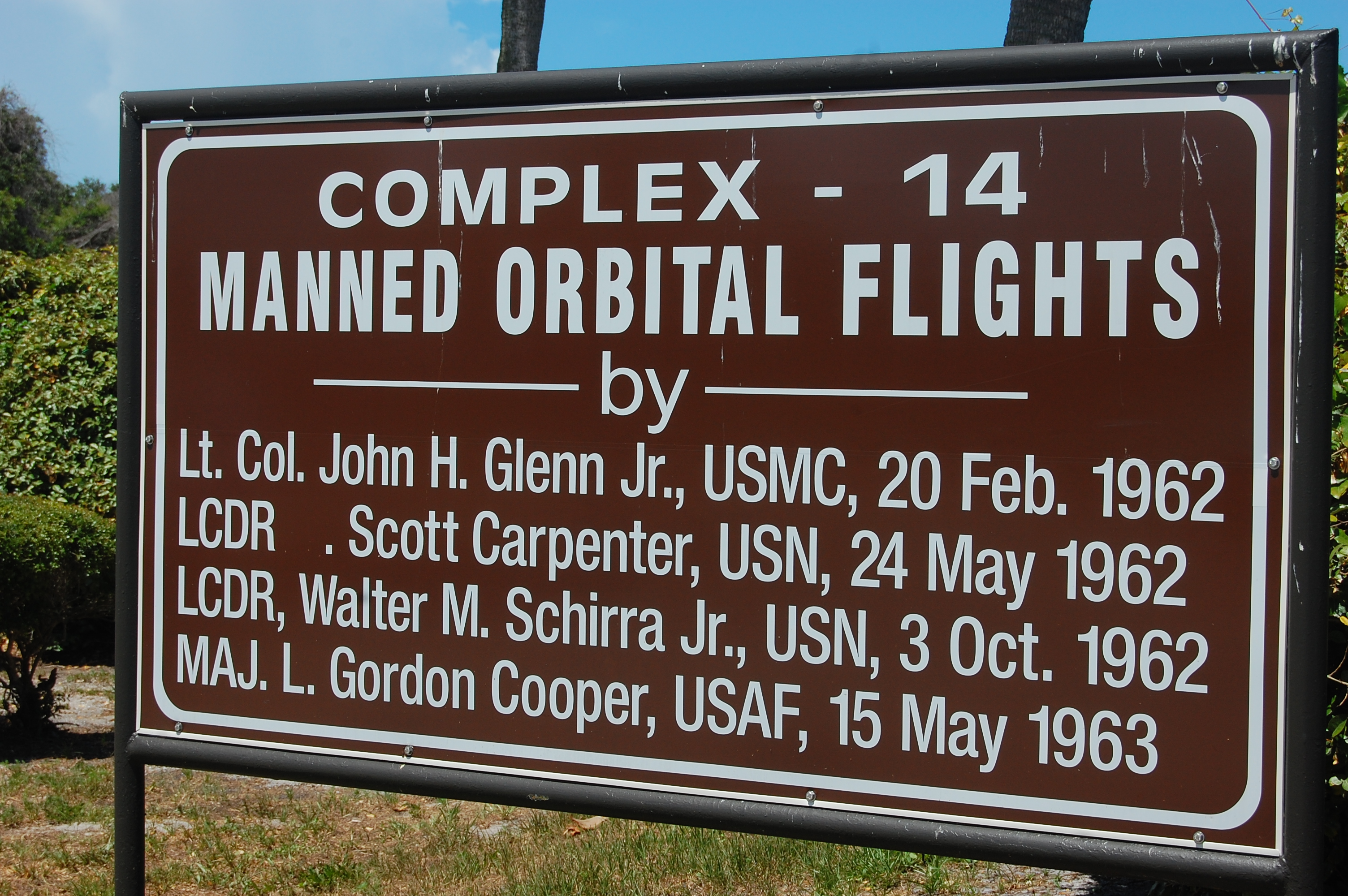
Sign

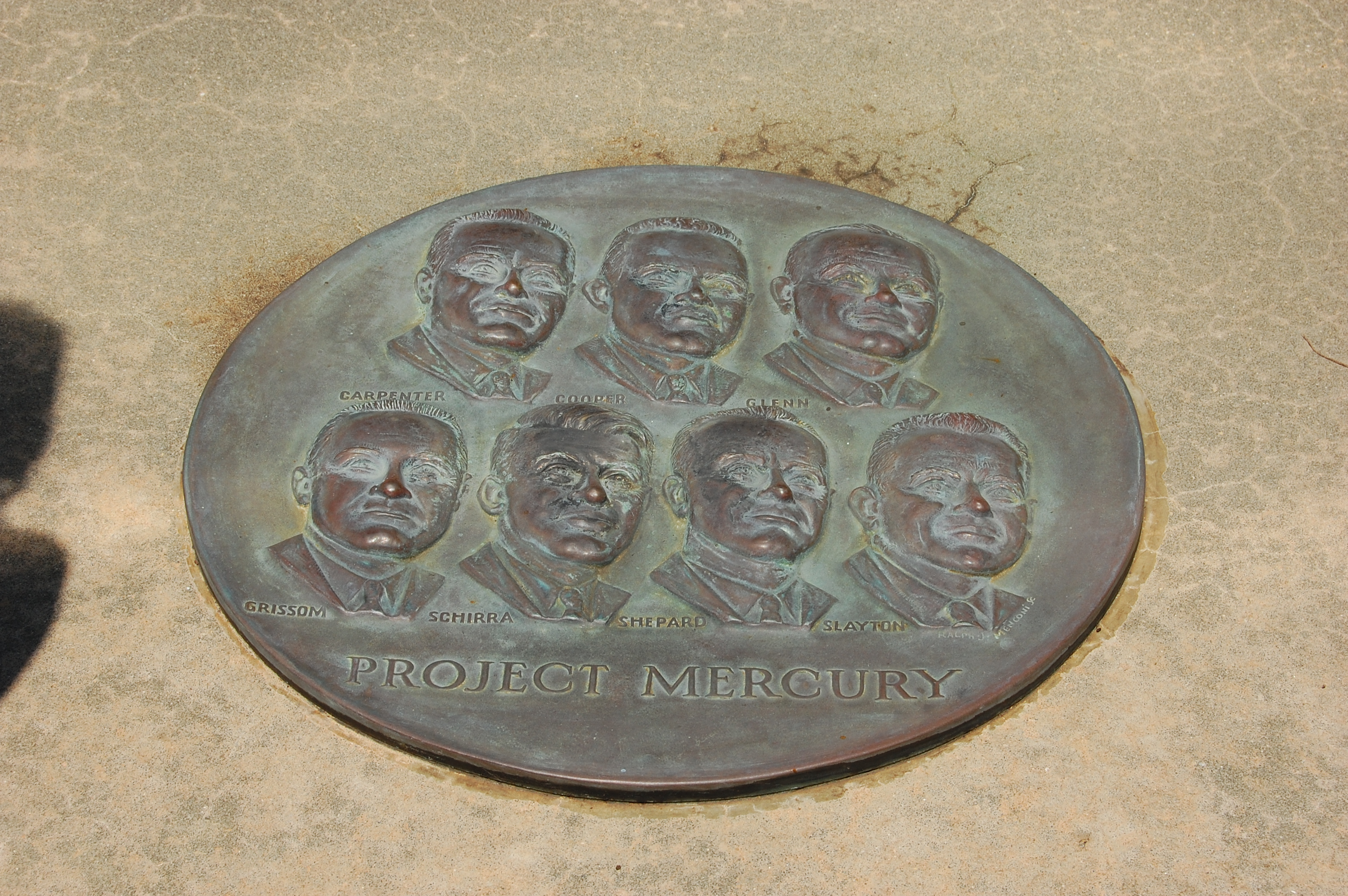
Mercury 7 plaque at the Mercury Monument

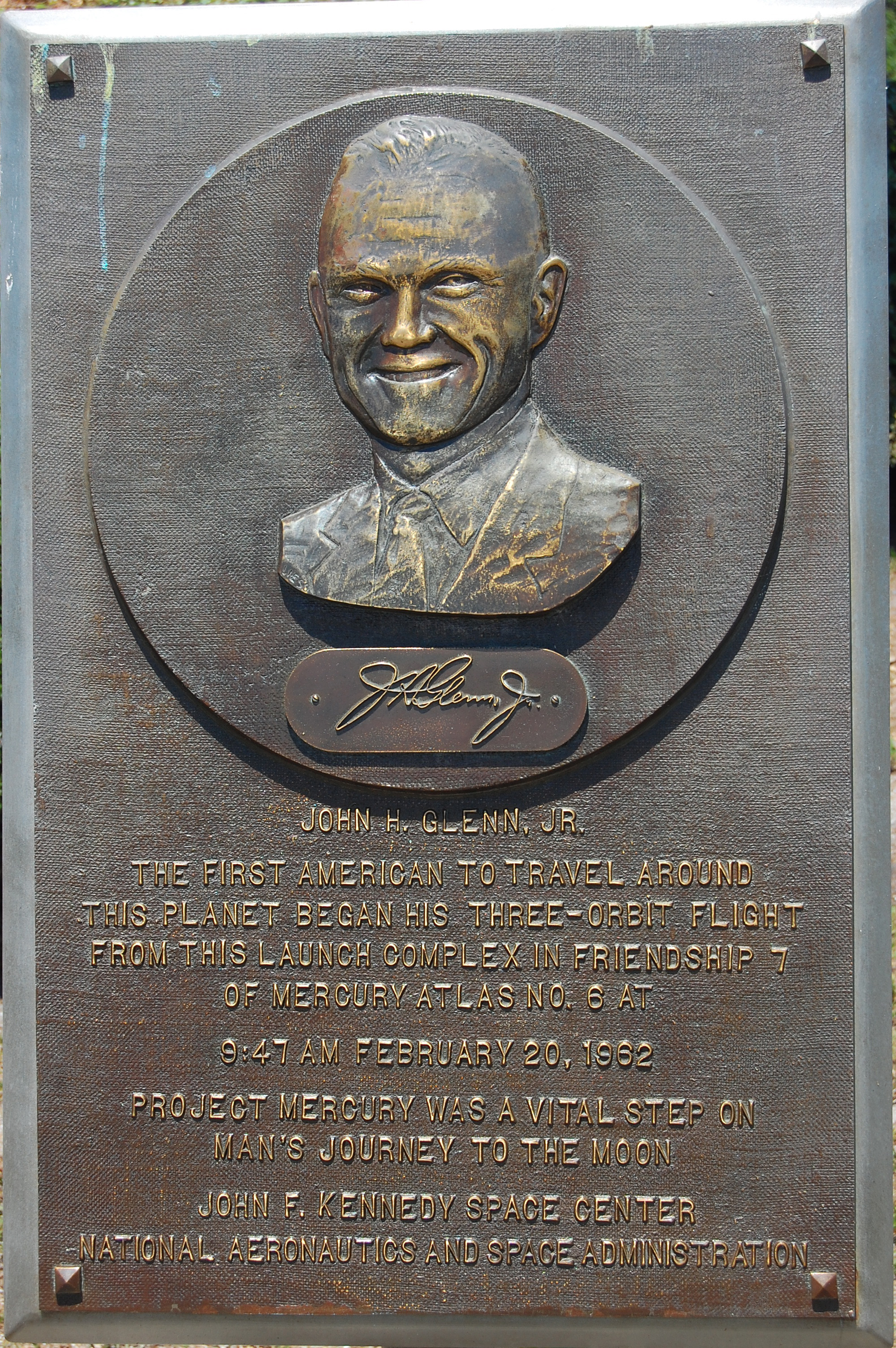
John Glenn plaque

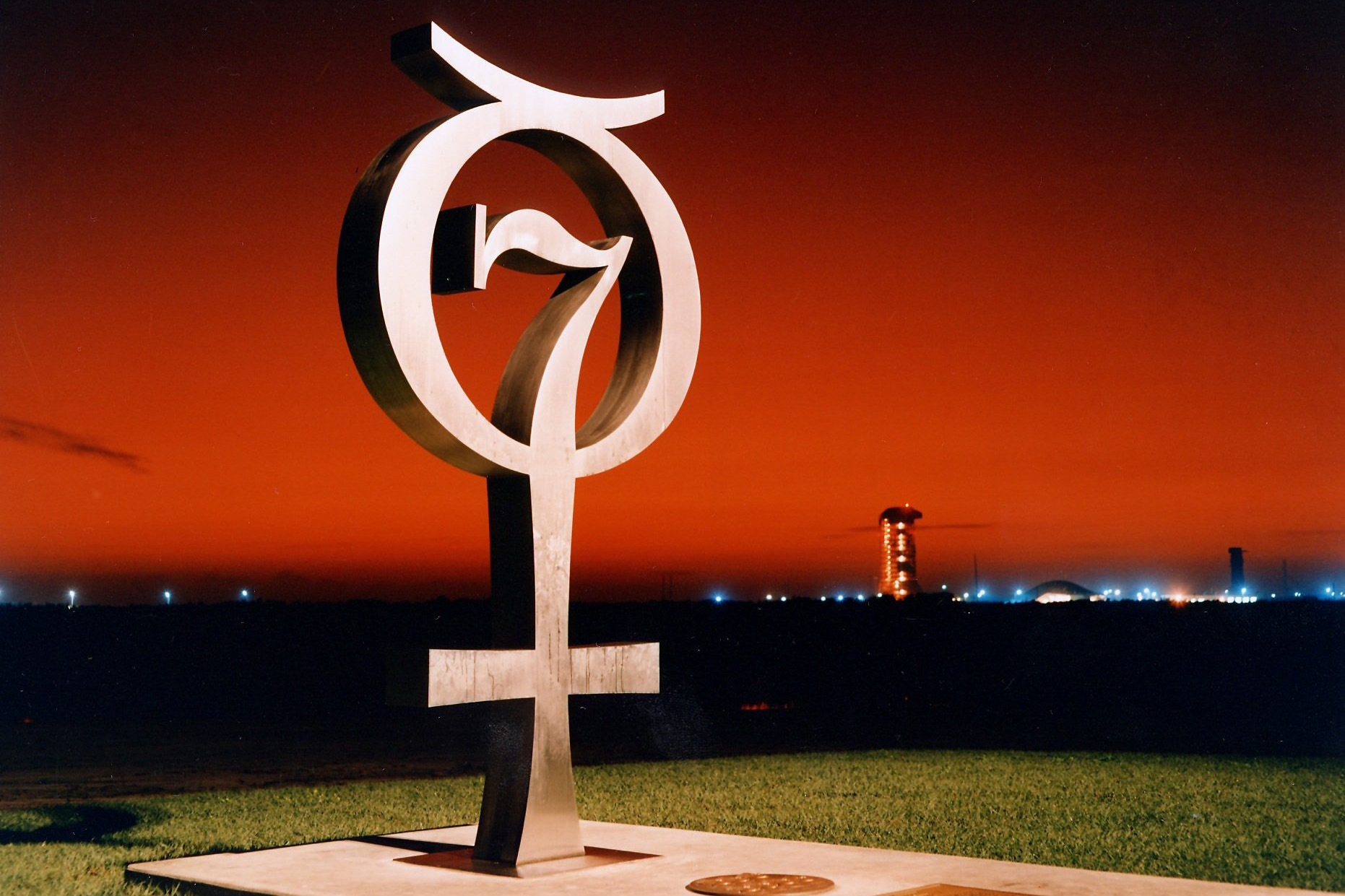
Mercury 7 Monument in 1964 with Pad 14 in the background

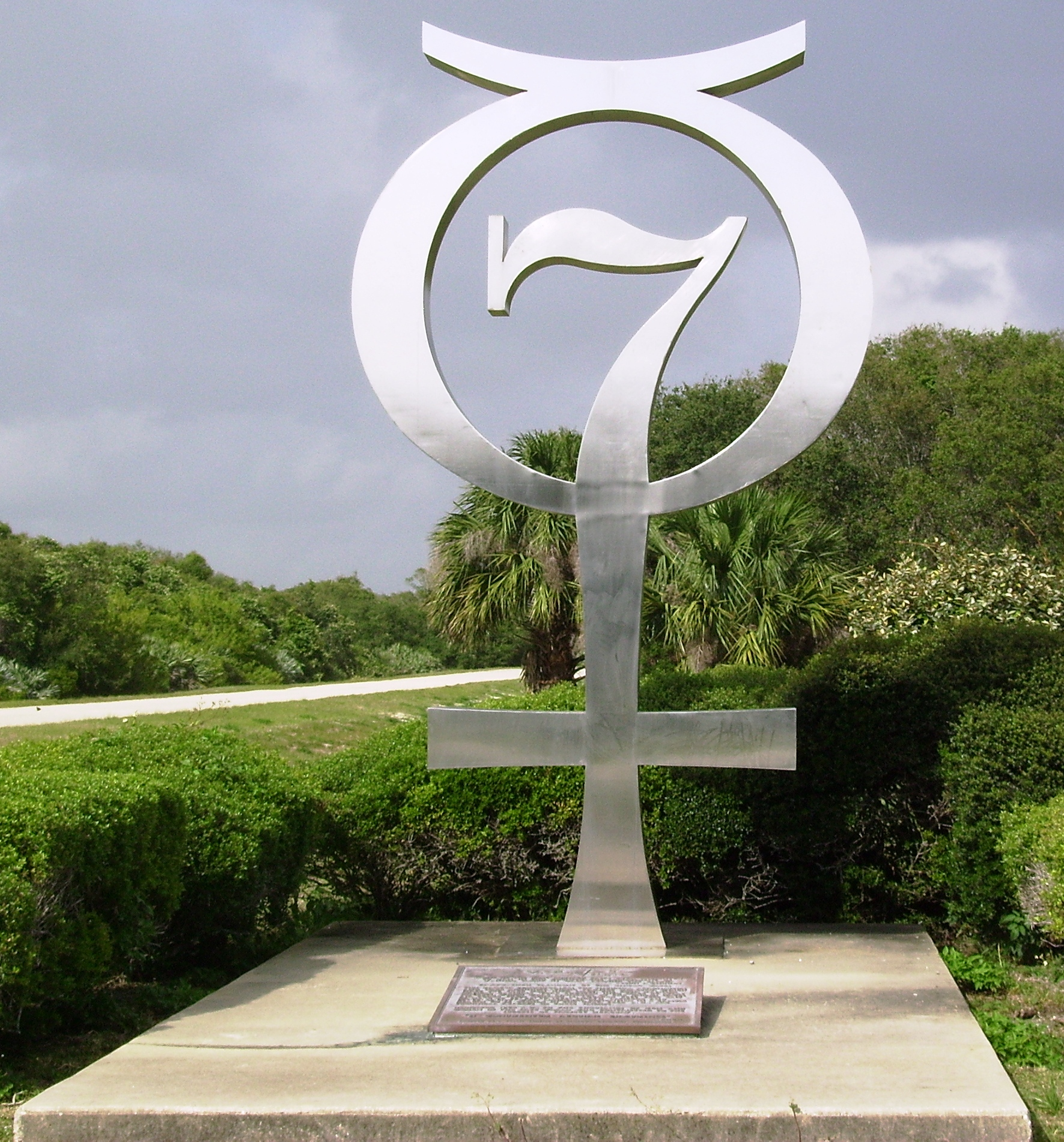
Mercury memorial at the road leading to CCAFS LC-14

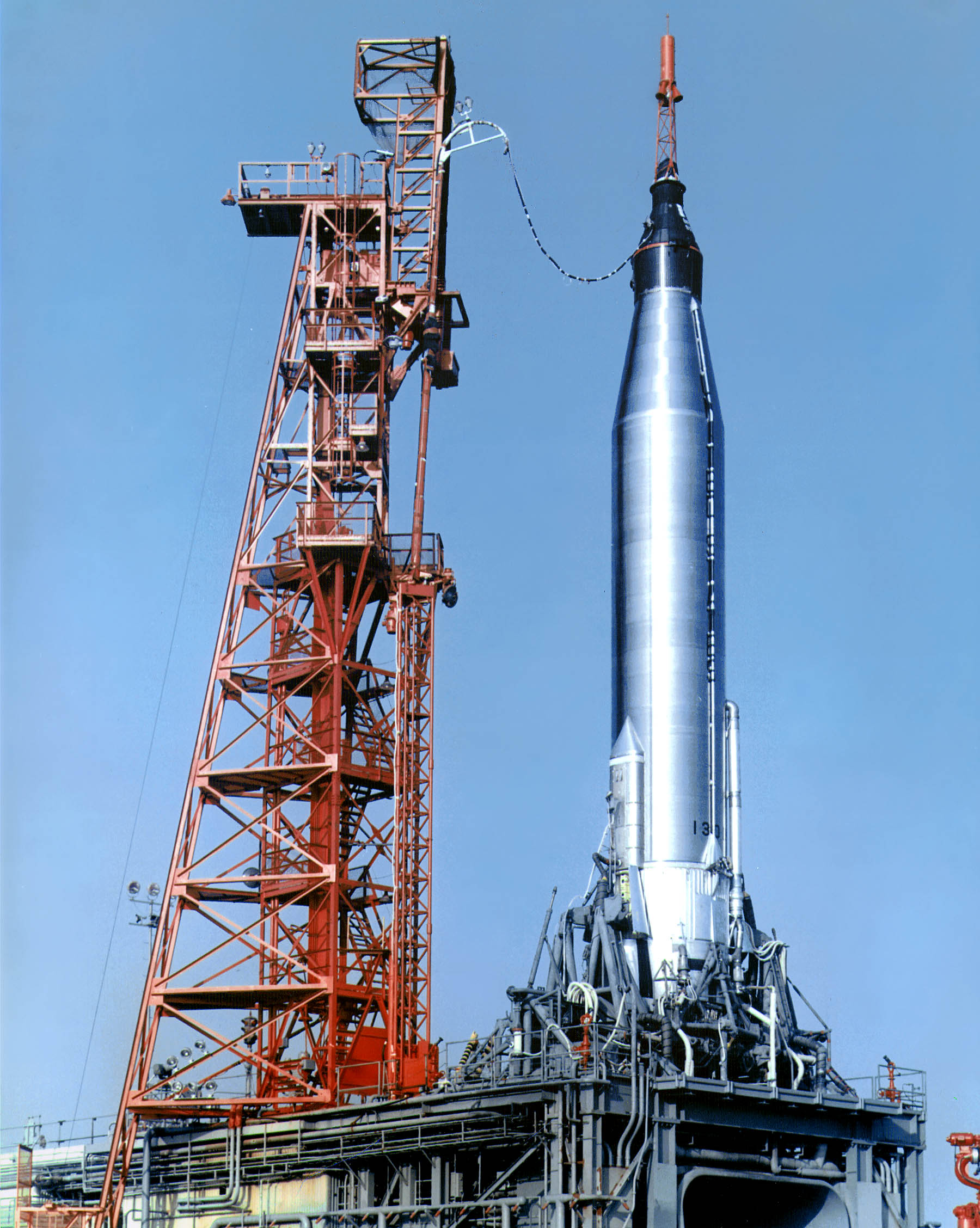
LC-14 with Mercury-Atlas 9

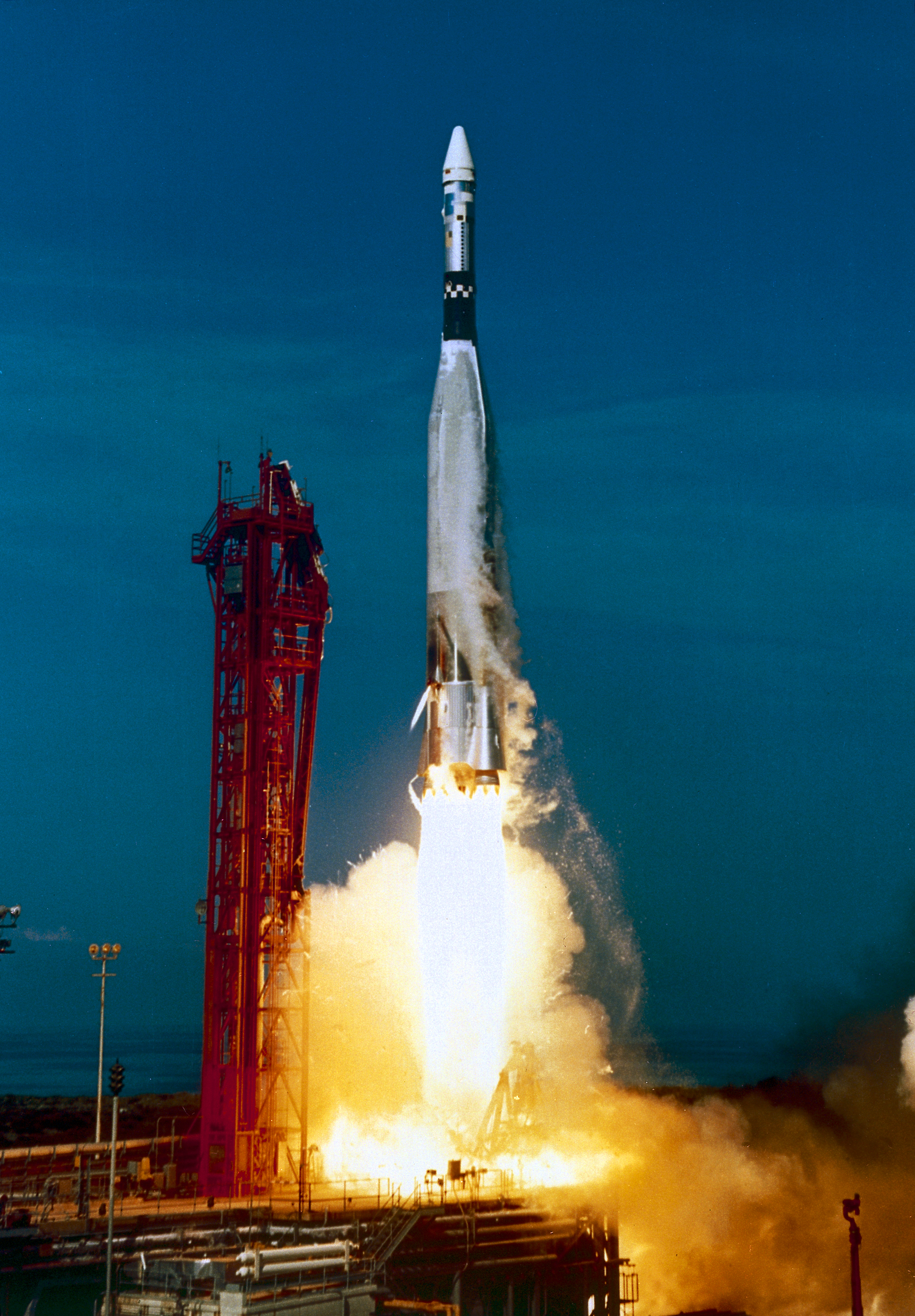
LC-14 in 1966, launching the ATV for Gemini 12

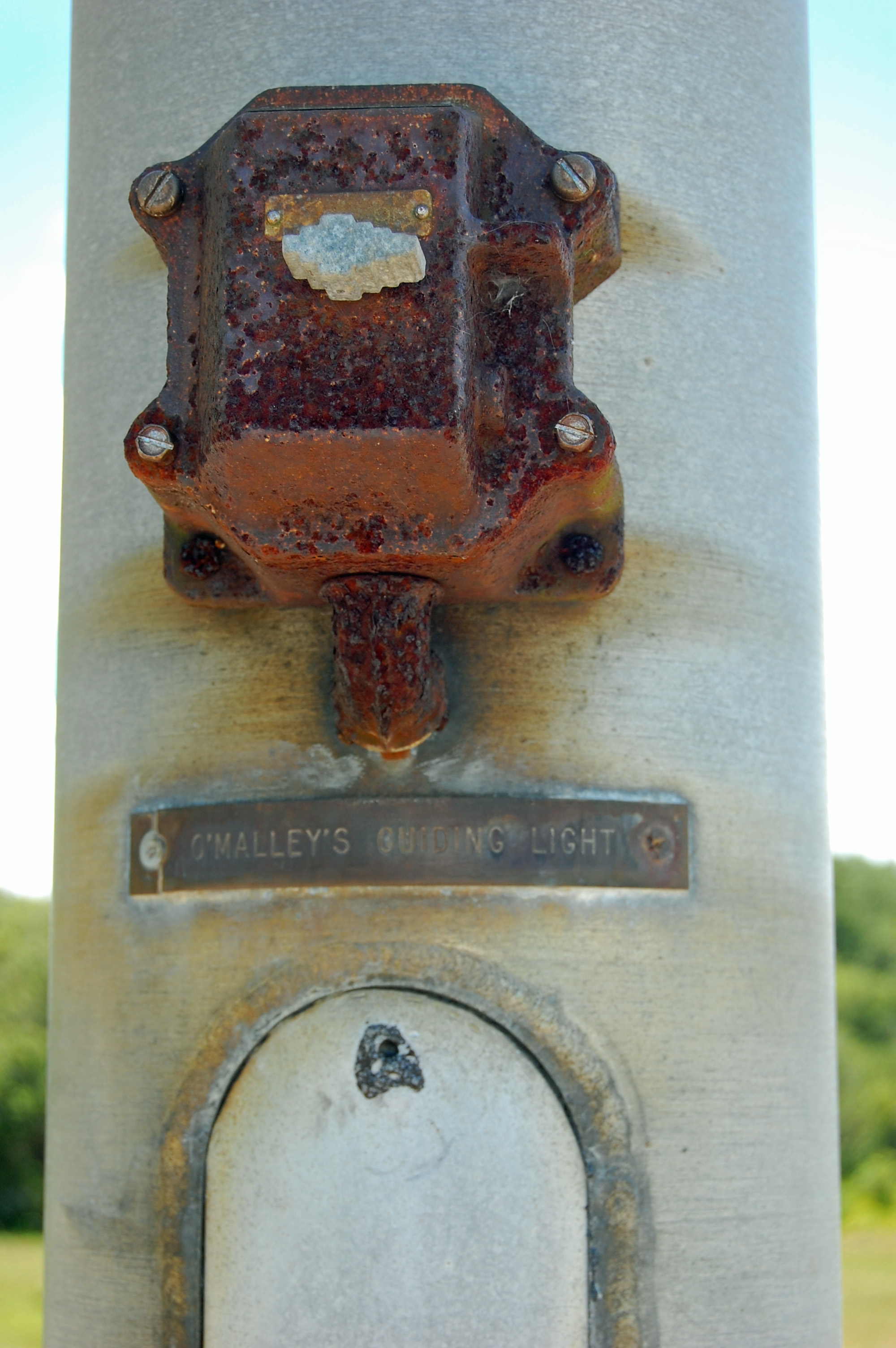
O'Malley's Guiding Light at the entrance

== See also ==
- Gagarin's Start, the Soviet/Russian equivalent launch site of first crewed spaceflights
- T. J. O'Malley - "O'Malley's Guiding Light" is at LC 14
