= Stoke Space Nova =

Reusable medium-lift launch vehicle

Nova Pathfinder
- Function: Medium-lift launch vehicle
- Manufacturer: Stoke Space
- Country of origin: United States

Size
- Height: 40.2 m (132 ft)
- Diameter: 4.2 m (14 ft)
- Mass: 227,000 kg (500,000 lb)
- Stages: 2

Associated rockets
- Comparable: Falcon 9; Rocket Lab Neutron

First stage
- Height: 27.1 m (89 ft)
- Diameter: 3.81 m (12.5 ft)
- Propellant mass: 183,705 kg (405,000 lb)
- Powered by: 7 × Zenith
- Maximum thrust: SL: 3,110 kN (700,000 lb_{f}); vac: 3,470 kN (780,000 lb_{f})
- Specific impulse: SL: 310 s (3.0 km/s); vac: 345 s (3.38 km/s)
- Propellant: CH4 / LOX

Second stage
- Height: 13.1 m (43 ft)
- Diameter: 4.2 m (14 ft)
- Propellant mass: 18,000 kg (40,000 lb)
- Powered by: 1 x Andromeda 2
- Maximum thrust: 111 kN (25,000 lb_{f})
- Specific impulse: 430 s (4.2 km/s)
- Propellant: LH_{2} / LOX

Launch history
- Status: In development
- Launch sites: Cape Canaveral LC-14
- Total launches: 0
- First flight: 2027 (planned)

Nova is a fully reusable medium-lift launch vehicle developed by Stoke Space. Announced in October 2023, the Pathfinder variant uses two stages with an expected payload capacity of 3 tonnes (3,000 kg) and 7 tonnes expendable to low Earth orbit (LEO). The first stage is designed to perform a return-to-launch-site (RTLS) or a drone ship landing.

The vehicle was selected as part of the Space Force's Orbital Services Program.

== Versions ==
Two variants of Nova are currently in development.

=== Pathfinder ===
The first stage design includes 7 full-flow staged combustion rocket engines, burning methalox.

The second stage measures 13 ft (4.0 m) in diameter and is 20 ft (6.1 m) tall. It uses a single Andromeda 2 hydrolox (liquid hydrogen/liquid oxygen) engine with 24 thrust chambers ringing a regeneratively cooled heatshield, eliminating the need for thermal tiles. The engine is surrounded by a metallic heat shield and a "ring" of 24 thrusters. The thrust chambers and nozzles are 3D-printed. The second-stage engines are fueled by cryogenic hydrogen. A center passive bleed aims to create an aerospike-like effect. Each thrust chamber is powered by a common set of turbopumps.

The fully stacked rocket measures 4 meters in diameter and approximately 40.2 meters in height.

=== Block 2 ===
Block 2 was announced on September 8, 2026. It features a larger 5 m (16 ft) fairing, with the second stage no longer featuring a taper. It can launch up to 15 tonnes (33,000 lb) to LEO in a fully reusable configuration, and up to 23 tonnes (51,000 lb) in an expendable configuration. It can also launch 4 tonnes (8,800 lb) to a Geostationary transfer orbit (GTO).

It is powered by 14 Zenith engines on the first stage, delivering a total thrust of 7,600 kN (1,700,000 lbf). The second stage features the Andromeda Block 2 engine, which delivers 670 kN (150,000 lbf) of thrust, an over fivefold increase from Andromeda 2. Unlike Pathfinder, each set of turbopumps now only powers two thrust chambers.

== Operations ==
Nova will launch from Cape Canaveral's Launch Complex 14. The company owns and operates a test launch facility in Moses Lake, Washington, where it conducted various tests of Nova.

== Development ==
The company unveiled the rocket's name, Nova, in October 2023. An engine designed for Nova's booster underwent its first test in June 2024, 18 months after the start of its development. It is designed to produce over 100,000 lbf (440 kN) of thrust upon lift-off. A hopper test of Nova's reusable second stage was conducted in September 2023, with an engine test in February 2024. A proof-test of a shortened first stage test tank was conducted in December 2023.

Stoke Space initially aimed to reach orbit by 2025. In July 2025, the company adjusted the target date to early 2026. In September 2026, it was announced that Pathfinder would first launch in 2027, with Block 2's first launch slated for 2029.

The first orbital launch will send an Autonomy-1, a satellite constructed by AstroForge, to a heliocentric orbit, with no attempt at recovery of either stage. Celestis will also fly their Infinite Flight payload on this mission.

Stoke Space began construction on its launch pad at Launch Complex 14 in October 2024, and completed construction in early 2026.

== Applications ==
Stoke Space says that Nova can be used for a variety of functions, including deploying satellites, lifting manufacturing and science experiments, collecting and returning satellites, and removing space debris.

== See also ==
- Firefly Aerospace – American aerospace company
- SpaceX – American spaceflight and AI company
- Blue Origin – American aerospace company
- Rocket Lab – American public spaceflight company
