= SM-65A Atlas =

First full-scale prototype of the Atlas missile

Atlas A (SM-65A)
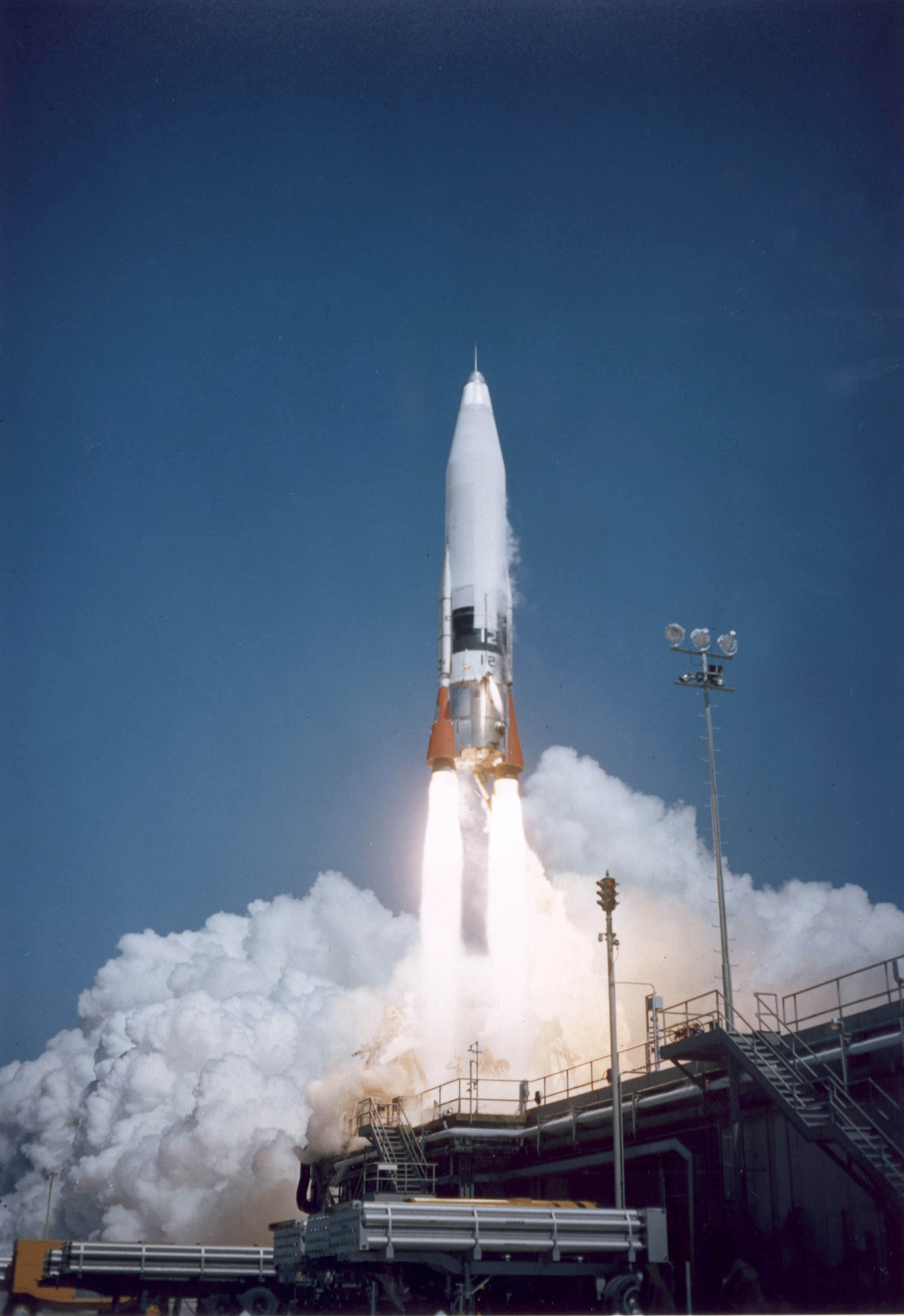
- Launch of Atlas 11A from LC-12 at CCAS
- Function: Prototype ICBM
- Manufacturer: Convair
- Country of origin: United States

Launch history
- Status: Retired
- Launch sites: LC-12 & LC-14, CCAFS
- Total launches: 8
- Success(es): 4
- Failure(s): 4
- First flight: 11 June 1957
- Last flight: 3 June 1958

Boosters
- No. boosters: 1
- Powered by: 2 XLR-89-1
- Total thrust: 341,128 lbf (1,517.41 kN)
- Specific impulse: 282 s
- Burn time: 133 s
- Propellant: RP-1/LOX

The Convair SM-65A Atlas, or Atlas A, was the first full-scale prototype of the Atlas missile, which first flew on 11 June 1957. Unlike later versions of the Atlas missile, the Atlas A did not feature the stage and a half design. Instead, the booster engines were fixed in place, and the sustainer engine was omitted. The propulsion system used on the initial Atlas As was an early version of the Rocketdyne MA-1 engines with conical thrust chambers that produced a mere 135,000 pounds of thrust, compared with the 360,000 pounds of the fully operational Atlas D. Several pieces of hardware found on the operational Atlas were either missing on the A-series or only partially implemented. Powered flight on the A-series would last about two minutes and compared to later Atlases, long pad hold-down times, with up to 11 seconds between engine start and launcher release.

The first three Atlases built were used merely for static firing tests with Missile 4A being the first flight article. It was delivered to Cape Canaveral in December 1956 and erected on LC-14 in March 1957, where it sat until the following summer.

== Test history ==
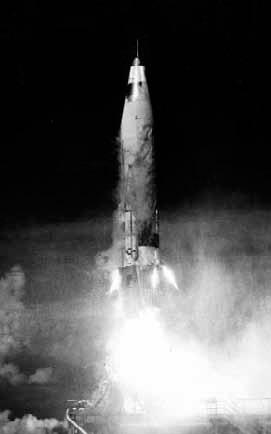
The last Atlas A (vehicle 16A) is launched at Cape Canaveral on 3 June

On June 11, 1957, the Atlas made its maiden voyage. Engine start proceeded normally and the launcher release system also functioned properly. All went well until T+26 seconds when the B-2 engine lost thrust, followed two seconds later by the B-1 engine. The Atlas reached a peak altitude of 9,800 feet (3,000 meters) and tumbled end-over-end through its own exhaust trail until T+50 seconds when the range safety officer sent the destruct command.

During 4A's launch, thousands of spectators lined the beaches around Cape Canaveral to watch, although the Air Force did not confirm that the new missile was in fact an Atlas. The sensational press reports of the missile cartwheeling and exploding in mid-air belied the fact that program officials did not really consider the test a failure, and that all things considered, the Atlas had performed far better than expected.

Analysis of telemetry data confirmed that the Atlas had malfunctioned due to hot exhaust gases being recirculated into the thrust section, which apparently caused failure of propellant ducting and engine shutdown due to LOX starvation. The pneumatic system also malfunctioned as tank pressure never properly transitioned to in-flight levels and along with propellant flow and pressure steadily decreased during ascent. The flight was considered a partial success because the missile had otherwise performed well. In particular, the Atlas's inflated balloon structure, which engineers doubted would even fly at all, had held together as the missile tumbled. The flight control system also worked well as it tried in vain to correct the missile's flight path.

Convair engineers decided that the Atlas needed a heat shield in the thrust section more substantial than the thin fiberglass one included on the missile. They proposed a modified heat sink made from steel and fiberglass, but the Air Force rejected that idea as the shield would be extremely heavy and also complicate booster section staging on operational Atlases. As one small modification, the pneumatic system was modified to vent inert helium gas down into the thrust section to reduce the risk of fire.

On September 25, Missile 6A was launched. Aside from more instrumentation in the thrust section and the above-mentioned helium vent modification, it was identical to 4A and predictably met the same fate as once again, the thrust section overheated. Thrust levels in both engines dropped to only 35% at T+32 seconds and two seconds later, the propulsion system completely shut down. The Range Safety destruct command was sent at T+63 seconds. This time, overheating and high vibration levels had caused a LOX regulator to fail, resulting in gas generator flameout. After this debacle, the Air Force relented and accepted the need for an improved heat shield. Other modifications were made as well, including removal of the long skirt covering the boattail and engine nozzles. The gas generator vent pipe was changed to point outward and away from the missile instead of directly underneath it. The engine nozzles were covered with fiberglass insulation boots and aluminum plumbing in the Atlas changed to steel plumbing which had a greater heat tolerance. The autopilot received additional filters to dampen vibration levels.

The overheating problems had not shown up on the static firing tests of Missiles 1A-3A, but it was later revealed that the engineering crews at the Sycamore test stand had had the plumbing changed to steel because it reduced the risk of overheating compared with the aluminum plumbing on flight article missiles. The PFRF (Pre Flight Readiness Firing) tests conducted on 4A and 6A also would have caused exhaust gases to go up into the boattail, and thus they probably already had internal damage at launch.

On December 17, Missile 12A lifted from LC-14. The modified boattail worked; the Atlas performed well on its first successful launch, an event that raised morale after the devastating blow of two Soviet space launches and the failure of Vanguard a week earlier. This was the first Atlas with a functional guidance system (although open loop—the guidance system was included merely for evaluation purposes and not actually added to the flight program until the B-series tests), as Missiles 4A and 6A merely had a dummy guidance receiver that test patterns were transmitted to. At T+75 seconds, the guidance system tracking beacon shorted, which caused a momentary large drain on the batteries but did not otherwise affect missile performance. The missile's flight trajectory in the yaw axis by the time of Booster Engine Cutoff (BECO) deviated by about 10,000 feet (3,000 meters) from the planned program, studies of trajectory data showed this anomaly to be nearly constant during powered flight. It was concluded that there had been an incorrect offset in the yaw axis, either from a misaligned engine, yaw gyro, or some combination of both. After the success of the launch, the Air Force acknowledged for the first time that the missile was in fact an Atlas.

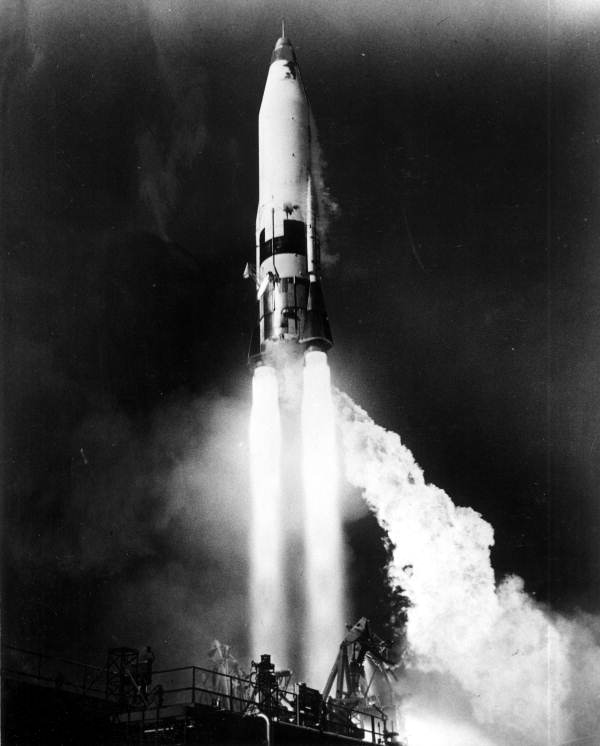
Atlas A launch from Cape Canaveral in 1958

The fourth Atlas test involved Missile 10A, which was erected on LC-12 in September and would have been the third Atlas launched, but there were considerable difficulties getting it ready for flight. After the postflight findings from 6A, it was taken down for modifications and a PFRF firing on December 10 resulted in the B-1 thrust chamber rupturing from rough combustion. The thrust chamber was replaced, and a launch attempt was made on December 16, but had to be aborted following a leak in the B-1 main fuel valve. A second launch attempt on January 7, 1958, failed due to another fuel valve leak, and finally on January 10, the missile was launched. 10A performed an almost perfect flight, with no abnormalities of note occurring. This was also the first Atlas with functioning vernier engines, although they were not attached to the autopilot loop.

On February 7, Missile 13A was launched from LC-14. The engines switched to an improved variant of the MA-1 system with bell-shaped thrust chambers and 150,000 pounds of thrust, also the verniers were added to the autopilot loop for the first time. The APS (Auxiliary Power System) ceased operating at liftoff due to improper disconnect of a pad umbilical. At T+108 seconds, the engines started oscillating in all three axes and the propulsion system quickly shut down due to propellant starvation caused by missile tumbling. The Atlas broke up at T+163 seconds. The failure was attributed to a short in the vernier engine feedback transducer which caused the unexpected engine oscillation. Flight data also confirmed that the B-2 turbopump had disintegrated due to loss of lubricant oil pressure. The lube oil manifold pressure had dropped rapidly at T+16 seconds and remained steady at 460 psi until a pressure surge and then dropoff at T+106 seconds. The turbopump broke apart at T+116 seconds due to a bearing failure, but the propulsion system already shut down due to missile tumbling so it ultimately had no effect on the outcome of the flight.

Missile 11A was launched from LC-12 on February 20. This was the first flight where a roll program was added to the autopilot. Once again, the vernier feedback transducer shorted, leading to complete loss of control at T+103 seconds. The booster engines shut down due to missile tumbling and breakup of the Atlas occurred at T+126 seconds. The V-2 vernier shut down at T+109 seconds due to an apparent LOX duct rupture, while the V-1 vernier operated until final missile destruction.

Missile 15A was launched on April 5, following two aborted launch attempts on March 28 and April 1, the latter being called off when the V-2 vernier exploded at ignition. Because aerodynamic heating was believed to have caused the electrical malfunctions on 13A and 11A, more insulation and resistors were added around the vernier wiring and the fairing around the engine nozzles extended. The flight was uneventful until T+96 seconds when a momentary drop in B-1 thrust occurred. Total engine shutdown occurred at T+105 seconds and the Atlas fell into the Atlantic Ocean, remaining structurally intact until impact. Postflight analysis concluded that a bearing in the LOX turbopump gearbox had come loose, resulting in shutdown of the pump and loss of thrust.

The Atlas A program concluded with the flight of 16A on June 3, which mostly completed its mission objectives, although several hardware malfunctions occurred. An improperly adjusted LOX regulator resulted in slightly below normal booster engine thrust. The pneumatic system experienced difficulties and helium bottle pressure was nearly down to zero at BECO. This was thought to be caused by a valve sticking open that allowed helium to enter the LOX tank uncontrollably, although the boil-off valve operated correctly and opened to vent the tank and prevent excessive pressure buildup. The V-1 vernier failed to start due to a leak resulting in loss of the start tank fuel supply. Telemetry data for the propellant utilization system was erratic or nonexistent for most of the flight, and the guidance tracking beacon failed at T+69 seconds; it was thought to have been torn off the missile. The pressure level in the turbopump gearbox was also modified slightly to prevent a recurrence of the malfunctions on 13A and 15A.

The Atlas A conducted eight test flights, of which four were successful. All launches were conducted from Cape Canaveral Air Force Station, at either Launch Complex 12 or Launch Complex 14.

== Launch history ==
Date	Time (GMT)	Pad	Serial	Apogee	Outcome	Remarks
1957-06-11	19:37	LC-14	4A	2 km (1.2 mi)	Failure	First launch attempt of an Atlas vehicle. Performance was normal until T+30 seconds when the missile lost thrust due to exhaust gases being sucked back into the boattail and burning through wiring. Range Safety issued the destruct command at T+50 seconds. The flight was declared a "partial success" because the Atlas's balloon skin had maintained its structural integrity until vehicle destruction.
1957-09-25	19:57	LC-14	6A	3 km (1.9 mi)	Failure	Loss of thrust followed by vehicle tumbling and RSO destruct at T+74 seconds due to overheating that led to gas generator failure.
1957-12-17	17:39	LC-14	12A	120 km (75 mi)	Success	First successful flight of an Atlas missile.
1958-01-10	15:48	LC-12	10A	120 km (75 mi)	Success	
1958-02-07	19:37	LC-14	13A	120 km (75 mi)	Failure	Short circuit in the guidance system caused engine shutdown and vehicle breakup at T+167 seconds.
1958-02-20	17:46	LC-12	11A	90 km (56 mi)	Failure	Short circuit in the guidance system caused engine shutdown and vehicle breakup at T+126 seconds.
1958-04-05	17:01	LC-14	15A	100 km (62 mi)	Failure	Turbopump failure caused loss of thrust at T+105 seconds. Vehicle remained structurally intact until impacting the Atlantic Ocean 200 miles downrange.
1958-06-03	21:28	LC-12	16A	120 km (75 mi)	Success	

== See also ==
- SM-65 Atlas
