= Stoke Space =

American aerospace company

- Type: Private
- Industry: Space
- Founded: 2020; 6 years ago
- Founders: Andy Lapsa; Tom Feldman
- Headquarters: Kent
- Products: Nova reusable launch vehicle
- Number of employees: 125+
- Website: stokespace.com

Stoke Space Technologies is an American rocket company based in Kent, Washington.

== History ==
The company was founded by former Blue Origin and SpaceX employees. In May 2020, the company won a $225,000 SBIR Phase I grant from the National Science Foundation to work on an integrated propulsion solution for reusable rocket upper stages. In February 2021, the company raised $9.1 million in seed funding in a round led by venture funds NFX Guild and MaC Venture Capital. In December 2021, the company raised $65 million in a Series A round led by Breakthrough Energy Ventures, funding development and testing of the upper stage of a reusable launch vehicle.

In 2022, the company created a prototype of their second stage engine ring. Their prototype had at least 22 static fires in total.

In 2023, CEO Andy Lapsa revealed their plan to create a fully and rapidly reusable orbital rocket.

In the first months of 2023, Stoke Space finished the construction of Hopper1, a full-scale second stage prototype, intended to test fluid mechanics. On March 8, 2023, the company was given LC-14 in Florida as a future launch pad. On March 18, Stoke Space's second stage conducted a wet dress rehearsal, where the company loaded both liquid oxygen (LOX) and liquid hydrogen into the stage's tanks, preparing it for launch without igniting the engines.

On September 17, 2023, Stoke Space conducted a "hop" test of Hopper2, testing their differential steering method. In 15 seconds, the vehicle ignited its 15 thrust chambers (half of the amount used on the operational vehicle), lifted 30 feet off the ground, showed its ability to steer without gimballing the engine like traditional rockets, and tested the actively cooled heat shield before successfully landing under three landing struts. In October 2023, Stoke Space announced a $100 million Series B funding round led by Industrious Ventures.

In April 2024, the company announced that it had completed assembly and installation of a first stage engine for test firing. In May 2024, the company announced significant construction progress in their engine test firing stand. The first successful hot fire of Stoke Space's full flow staged combustion (FFSC) Engine, named Zenith, was reported in June 2024.

In January 2025, the company raised $260M in Series C funding and another $510M in October in Series D led by US Innovative Technology Fund along with $100M in debt. In February 2026, the company extended its series D to $860M.

In September 2026, Stoke Space announced that it had raised $1 billion in series E funding. The company also unveiled the Nova Block 2, a fully reusable-medium lift launch vehicle capable of carrying 15 tonnes (15,000 kg) to low Earth orbit (LEO).

== Facilities ==
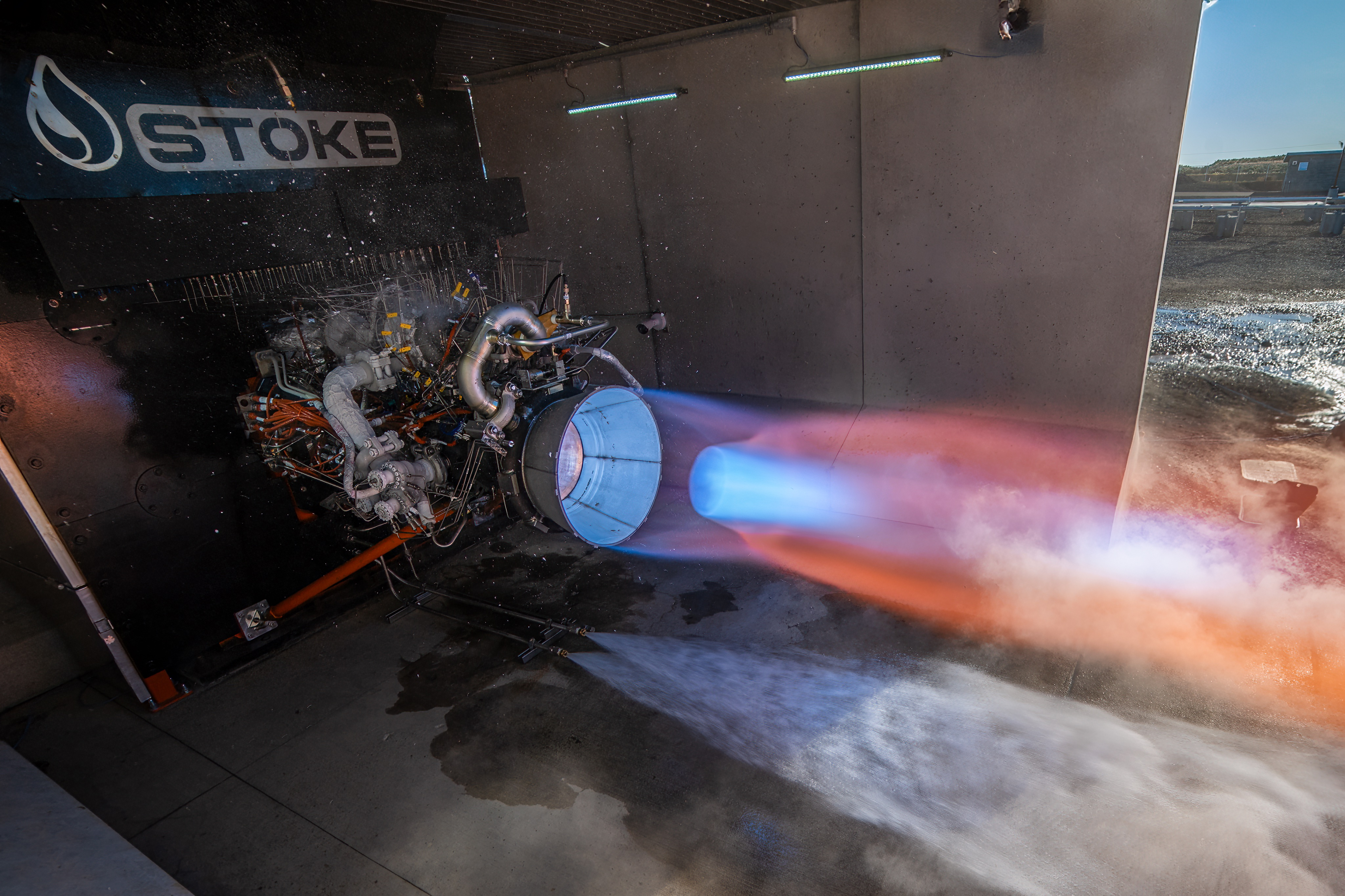
Stoke Space's FFSC Engine hotfire

The company operates a rocket test facility on a 75-acre (30 ha) site near Moses Lake's airport. Additionally, they also operate a 168,000 square foot assembly facility in Kent, Washington, which doubles as their headquarters and planned mission control.

== Technology ==
Nova is a fully reusable medium-lift launch vehicle developed by Stoke Space. Announced in October 2023, the Pathfinder variant uses two stages with an expected payload capacity of 3 tonnes (3,000 kg) and 7 tonnes expendable to low Earth orbit (LEO). The first stage is designed to perform a return-to-launch-site (RTLS) or a drone ship landing.

The vehicle was selected as part of the Space Force's Orbital Services Program.
