= Mercury-Atlas 2 =

1961 uncrewed test flight

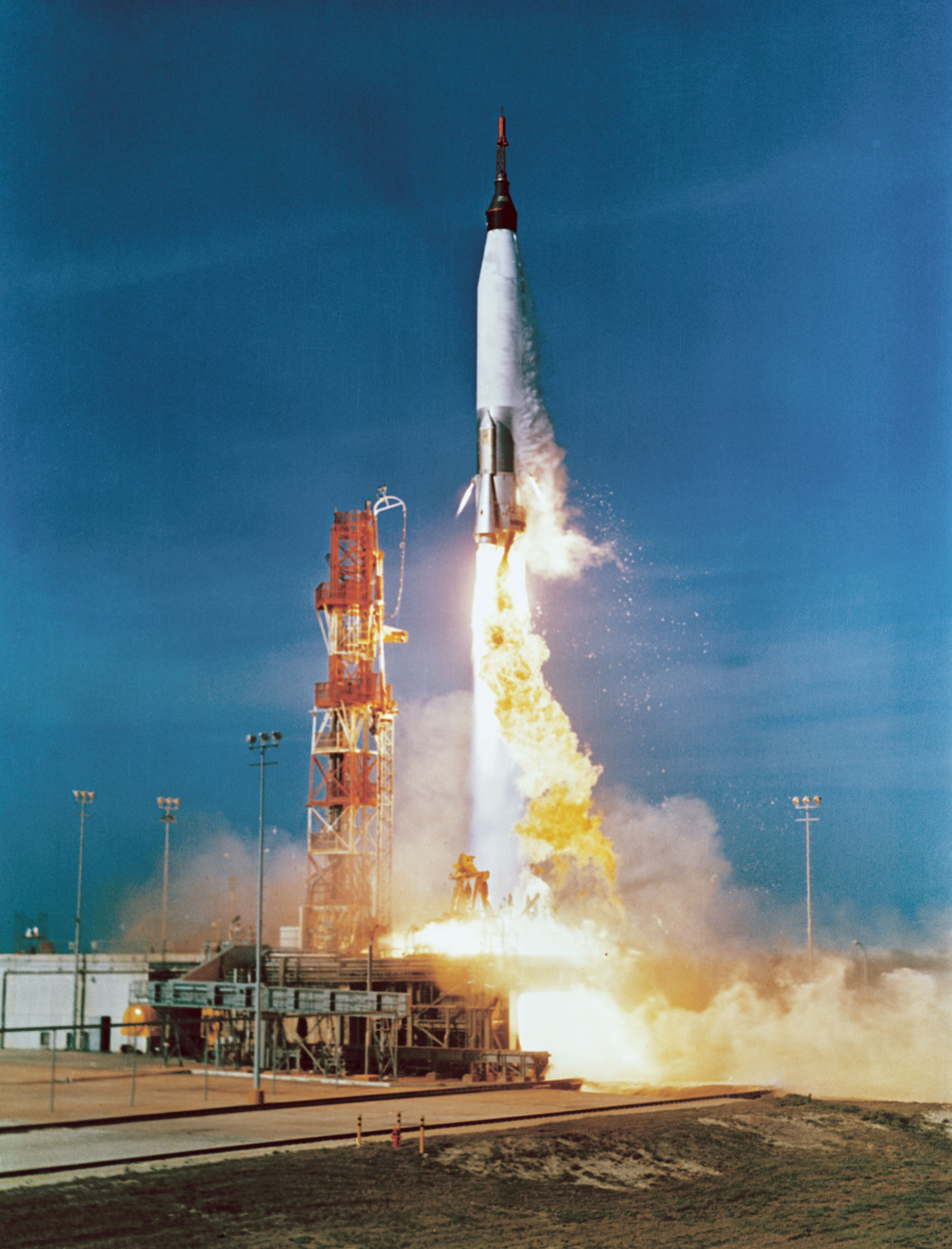
- Launch of MA-2
- Mission type: Test flight
- Operator: NASA
- Mission duration: 17 minutes, 56 seconds
- Distance travelled: 2,305 kilometres (1,432 mi)
- Apogee: 183 kilometres (114 mi)

Spacecraft properties
- Spacecraft: Mercury No.6
- Manufacturer: McDonnell Aircraft
- Launch mass: 1,154 kilograms (2,544 lb)

Start of mission
- Launch date: February 21, 1961, 14:10 UTC
- Rocket: Atlas LV-3B 67-D
- Launch site: Cape Canaveral LC-14

End of mission
- Landing date: February 21, 1961, 14:28 UTC
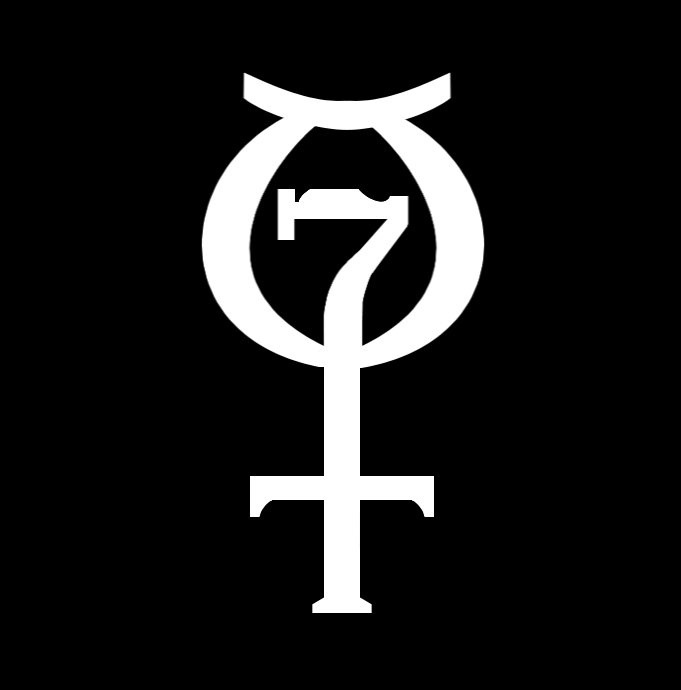
- Project Mercury; Mercury-Atlas series

Mercury-Atlas 2 (MA-2) was an uncrewed test flight of the Mercury program using the Atlas rocket. It launched on February 21, 1961, at 14:10 UTC, from Launch Complex 14 at Cape Canaveral, Florida, United States.

Test objectives for this flight were concerned with the ability of the spacecraft to withstand reentry under the temperature-critical abort conditions and with the capability of the Atlas to meet the proper injection conditions. Convair had promised to deliver thicker-skinned Atlas vehicles for subsequent flights, however Missile 67D was the last of the thin-skinned model and so it had to be modified for the Mercury mission, incorporating a stainless steel reinforcing band installed around the vehicle between stations 502 and 510. A thin sheet of asbestos was installed between the reinforcing band and the tank skin. This modification was installed as a precaution against the type of failure which had occurred on the previous MA-1 flight. The booster's flight path was also modified somewhat from Mercury-Atlas 1, being placed on a more shallow trajectory so as to reduce aerodynamic loads.

The Atlas lifted into a clear blue February sky quite different from the cloudy, foggy weather of the MA-1 flight. Everyone in the blockhouse waited nervously for the vehicle to pass through the critical max q zone. When it did so successfully, there was "enormous jubilation" from the launch team. MA-2 flew a successful suborbital mission that lasted 17 minutes 56 seconds. Altitude reached was 114 miles (183 km), speed, 13,227 mph (21,287 km/h). All test objectives were fully met, the only problems being a bit of propellant slosh. The capsule was recovered 1,432 miles (2,305 km) downrange. Peak acceleration was 15.9 g (156 m/s²). Mass 1,154 kg.

Mercury spacecraft #6 and Atlas #67-D were used in the Mercury-Atlas 2 mission. The Mercury capsule is currently displayed at the Houston Museum of Natural Science, Houston, TX.

== See also ==
- Splashdown
