= Big Joe 1 =

Uncrewed boilerplate Mercury program capsule

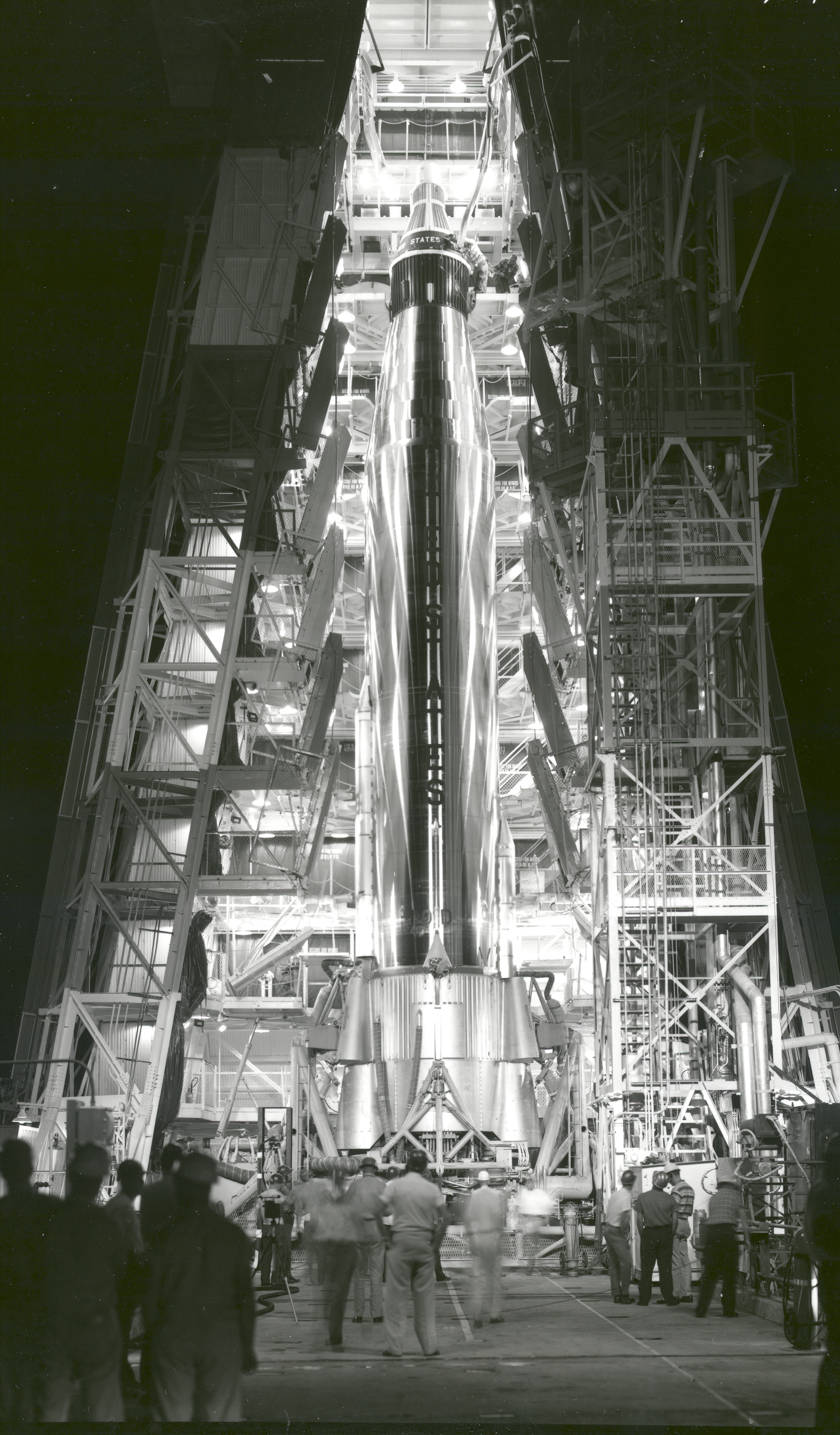
- Big Joe 1 at LC-14 in September 1959.
- Mission type: Reentry test
- Operator: NASA
- Mission duration: 13 min
- Distance travelled: 2,292 kilometres (1,424 mi)
- Apogee: 153 kilometres (95 mi)

Spacecraft properties
- Spacecraft type: Mercury boilerplate
- Manufacturer: McDonnell Aircraft
- Launch mass: 1,159 kilograms (2,555 lb)

Start of mission
- Launch date: 9 September 1959, 08:19 GMT
- Rocket: Atlas-10D
- Launch site: Cape Canaveral, LC-14

End of mission
- Recovered by: USS Strong
- Landing date: 9 September 1959, 08:32 GMT
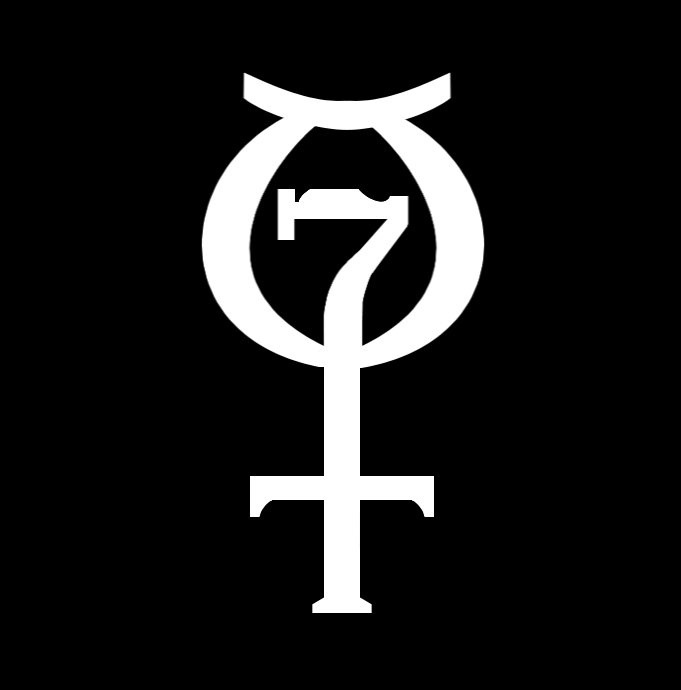
- Project Mercury; Mercury-Atlas series

Big Joe 1 (Atlas-10D) launched an uncrewed boilerplate Mercury capsule from Cape Canaveral, Florida on 9 September 1959. The purposes of the Big Joe 1 were to test the Mercury spacecraft ablative heat shield, afterbody heating, reentry dynamics attitude control and recovery capability. It was also the first launch of a spacecraft in Project Mercury.

Two flight readiness firings (FRF) were performed on Big Joe 1. The first, on 1 September 1959, ended immediately after T-0 because the ignition stage delay timer commanded shutdown of the rocket engines when neither sustainer nor main engine ignition followed normal vernier ignition. There was no booster or stand damage. The second FRF was successfully completed on 3 September 1959, with normal ignition, transition to main stage and shutdown by the engine timer after approximately 19 seconds of running time.

The prelaunch countdown went relatively smoothly, with one delay caused by the Atlas's LOX fill and drain valve failing to close. At 08:19 GMT on 9 September, Big Joe lifted from LC-14 atop Atlas-10D. All went well until the two-minute mark when telemetry readouts indicated that the booster section had failed to jettison. The dead weight from the booster engines resulted in below normal velocity, and consequently the guidance system did not generate the planned SECO (Sustainer Engine Cut-Off) signal at T+270 seconds because the required altitude and velocity had not been achieved. SECO was instead caused by LOX depletion at T+293 seconds. The Range Safety manual fuel cutoff command was received by the booster, but had no effect because the late SECO had resulted in depletion of helium control gas needed to close the propellant valves. All valves remained open, causing residual engine thrust and bumping of the Mercury capsule following separation. In addition, the guidance system did not generate the separation signal for the capsule due to insufficient altitude and velocity, so ground crews had to repeatedly fire the RCS (Reaction Control System) thrusters to tear the capsule free and in doing so exhausted the propellant supply. Navy recovery crews hurried to locate the capsule following splashdown and after a few hours, did so. The boilerplate Mercury, having landed some 500 miles (800 km) short of the target point, was found to have survived the mission in good condition and verified the ablative heat shield. Plans for a beryllium heat shield in the event the ablative one did not work were scrapped.

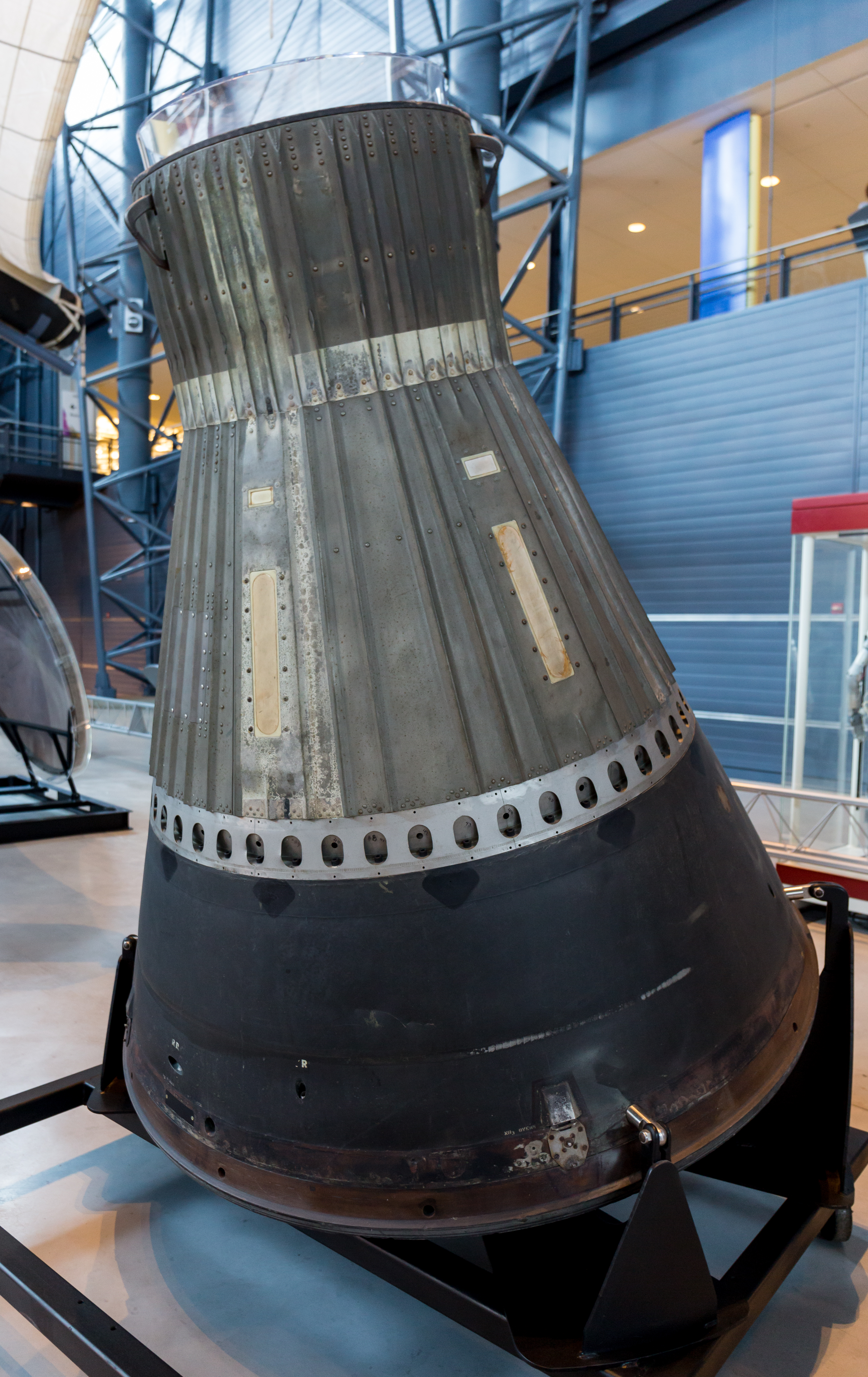
The Big Joe Mercury capsule on display at the Steven F. Udvar-Hazy Center

The Mercury capsule flew a 2,292 kilometres (1,424 mi) ballistic flight to the altitude of 140 kilometres (87 mi). The capsule was recovered and studied for the effect of re-entry heat and other flight stresses from its 13-minute flight. Since the data from Big Joe 1 satisfied NASA requirements, a second launch, Big Joe 2 (Atlas-20D), which had been scheduled for the fall of 1959, was canceled and the launch vehicle was transferred to the Atlas-Able program.

While the Mercury team was satisfied with the flight, Convair Division engineers were not. The Atlas had failed to stage its booster section and overall vehicle performance was rather marginal. They listed the flight in official records as a failure. The staging problem was traced to a probable failure of the electrical circuit that provided power to the Conax separation valves, so additional instrumentation would be fitted to them on subsequent flights. Convair's morale was soon raised however by the successful launch of Atlas-12D from Vandenberg Air Force Base on the West Coast followed by the vehicle being declared officially "operational".

The Mercury spacecraft used in the Big Joe 1 mission is displayed at the National Air and Space Museum's Steven F. Udvar-Hazy Center in Chantilly, Virginia.

== See also ==
- Little Joe
- Splashdown
