= Mercury-Atlas 9 =

1963 NASA Mercury program crewed flight

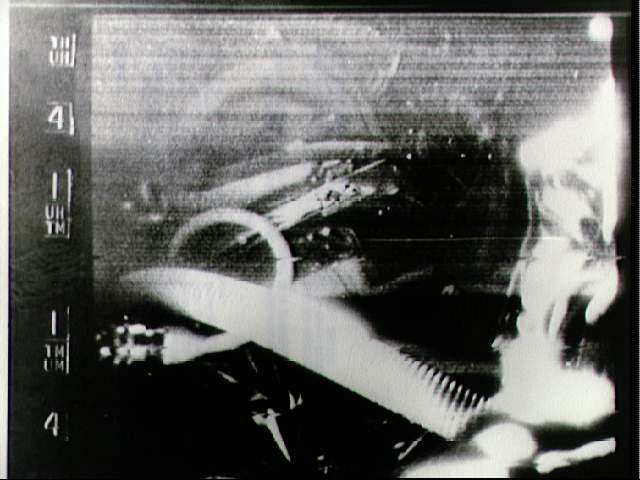
- L. Gordon Cooper, photographed by a slow-scan television camera aboard Faith 7
- Mission type: Test flight
- Operator: NASA
- COSPAR ID: 1963-015A
- SATCAT no.: 576
- Mission duration: 34 hours, 19 minutes, 49 seconds
- Distance travelled: 878,971 kilometers (474,606 nautical miles)
- Orbits completed: 22

Spacecraft properties
- Spacecraft: Mercury No.20
- Manufacturer: McDonnell Aircraft
- Launch mass: 1,360 kilograms (3,000 lb)

Crew
- Crew size: 1
- Members: L. Gordon Cooper, Jr.
- Callsign: Faith 7

Start of mission
- Launch date: May 15, 1963, 13:04:13 UTC
- Rocket: Atlas LV-3B 130-D
- Launch site: Cape Canaveral LC-14

End of mission
- Recovered by: USS Kearsarge
- Landing date: May 16, 1963, 23:24:02 UTC
- Landing site: South-east of Midway Island, Pacific Ocean

Orbital parameters
- Reference system: Geocentric
- Regime: Low Earth orbit
- Perigee altitude: 161.5 kilometers (87.2 nautical miles)
- Apogee altitude: 267.0 kilometers (144.2 nautical miles)
- Inclination: 32.5 degrees
- Period: 88.77 minutes
- Epoch: May 15, 1963
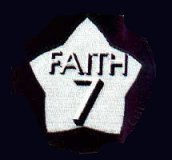
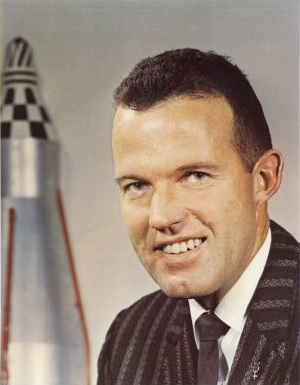
- Spacecraft name as painted on the capsule side Leroy Gordon "Gordo" Cooper, Jr. Project Mercury; Crewed missions

Mercury-Atlas 9 was the final crewed space mission of the U.S. Mercury program, launched on May 15, 1963, from Launch Complex 14 at Cape Canaveral, Florida. The spacecraft, named Faith 7, completed 22 Earth orbits before splashing down in the Pacific Ocean, piloted by astronaut Gordon Cooper, then a United States Air Force major. The Atlas rocket was No. 130-D, and the Mercury spacecraft was No. 20. As of September 2026, this mission marks the last time an American was launched alone to conduct an entirely solo orbital mission.

== Mission objectives ==
- Mission goal: Greater than 1 day in orbit
- Flight duration objective: 22 orbits resulting in a ~34 hour mission
- Capsule mass: 3,000 pounds (1,400 kg). The heaviest Mercury capsule due to enhancements to support longer flight mission duration

== Mission personnel ==
- Astronaut: L. Gordon Cooper, Jr.
- Backup Astronaut: Alan Shepard
- Flight Director – Red Team: Chris Kraft
- Flight Director – Blue Team: John Hodge
- Mercury Seven group: In addition to Shepard, each of the original Mercury Seven astronauts supported the orbital journey of Mercury 9 - John Glenn on a command ship near Japan, Scott Carpenter in Hawaii, Gus Grissom at a tracking station in Mexico, Wally Schirra as capsule communicator at Mercury mission control at Cape Canaveral, and Deke Slayton as an observer at the Cape.
- Worldwide support teams: Because MA-9 would orbit over nearly every part of the world from 32.5 degrees north to 32.5 degrees south, a total of 28 ships, 171 aircraft, and 18,000 servicemen were assigned to support the mission.

== Mission planning ==
=== Debate over Mercury project continuation ===
The Mercury-Atlas 8 flight of Walter Schirra on October 3, 1962, had been so nearly perfect that some at NASA thought that the United States should quit while it was ahead and make MA-8 the last Mercury mission rather than risk a future disaster. The argument that MA-8 should be the last Mercury mission held that NASA had pushed the first-generation Mercury hardware far enough, and taking more chances on another longer mission was not warranted; instead, NASA should move on to the Gemini program. Manned Spacecraft Center officials, however, believed that the Mercury team should be given the chance to test a human in space for a full day. In addition, all of the Soviet single-seat Vostok spacecraft launched after Vostok 1 lasted for more than a day; thus the Mercury 9 flight would bring the Mercury spacecraft up to the same level as that of the Soviets.

=== Spacecraft preparations ===
In September 1962, NASA concluded negotiations with McDonnell to modify four Mercury spacecraft (#12, #15, #17 and #20) to a configuration that supported a one-day mission. Such changes to the spacecraft included the removal of the periscope and a redundant set of thrusters, and the addition of extra batteries and oxygen tanks.

In November 1962, Gordon Cooper was chosen to pilot the MA-9 mission and Alan Shepard was picked as backup.

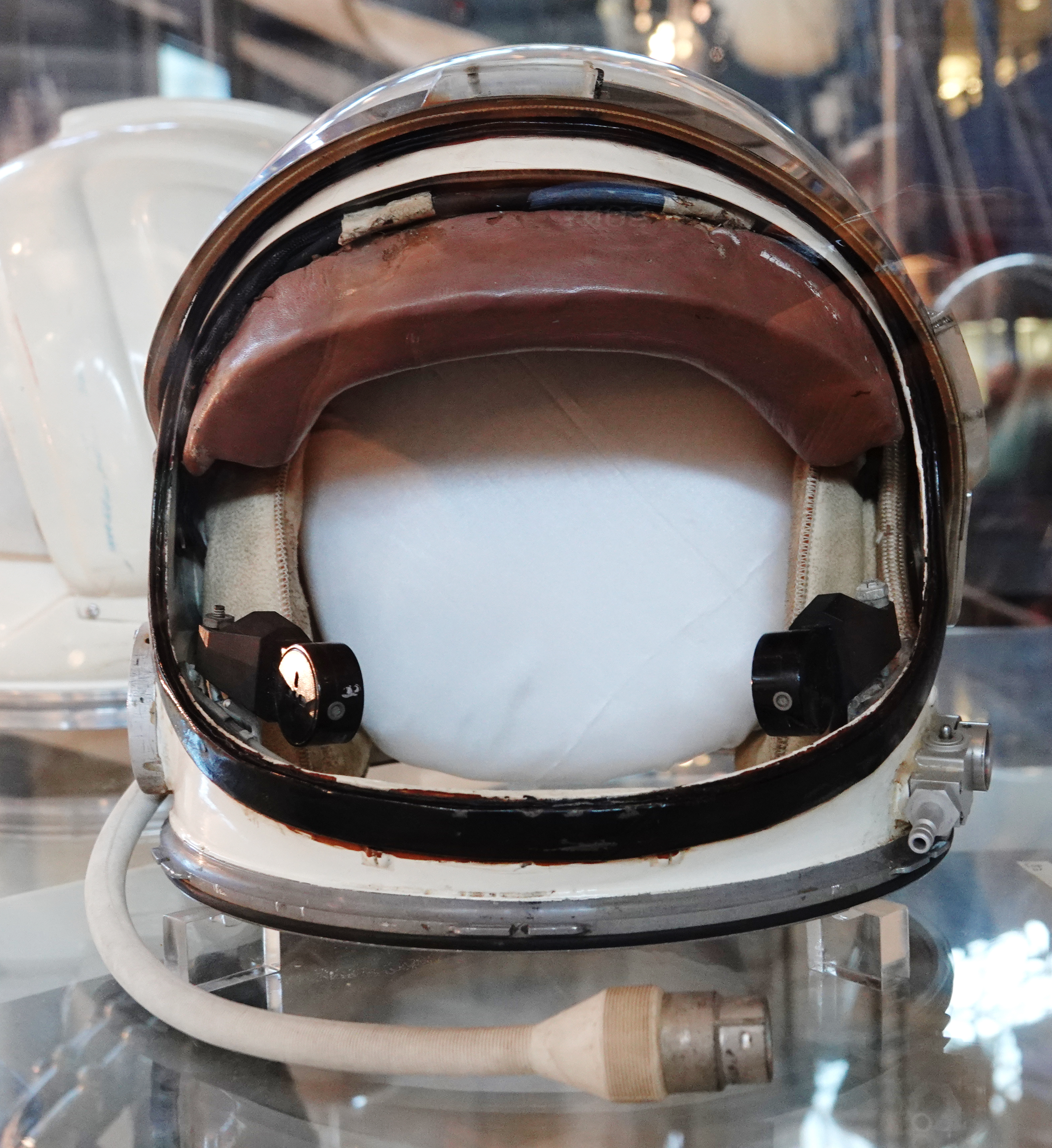
Cooper's Mercury helmet

Cooper's decision to name his capsule Faith 7 was based on the faith he had in the Atlas booster and Mercury capsule to carry out the mission successfully, although it was reported in The Washington Post that some NASA officials were skeptical of the idea.

=== Booster preparations ===
The Atlas booster used for MA-9 sported several technical improvements, most notably an enhanced propulsion system with a hypergolic igniter that would eliminate the need for hold-down time at launch to prevent rough combustion. With seven successful Mercury launches in a row, the failures of the early days seemed like a distant memory by early 1963 and NASA officials had a high degree of confidence in the Atlas that overshadowed its still spotty launch record. At the first meeting of senior MSFC officials for the year (January 11), Walter Williams noted that the Air Force had yet to provide an explanation for two Atlas F failures during the second half of 1962. Until the investigation committees released their findings and cleared the Atlas D of guilt by association, Cooper's flight could be delayed. During the seven months between Schirra's and Cooper's flights, there were five failures of Atlas D vehicles (one of them an Atlas-Agena, the rest operational ICBM tests). NASA did not let its guard down on the Atlas, despite the recent high degree of success enjoyed by Project Mercury.

When Atlas 130D received its factory rollout on January 30, it was found to have damaged wiring and had to be sent back for repairs. At his first press conference on February 8, Gordon Cooper admitted to not knowing much about the booster problems and focused instead on the enhancements made to his Mercury capsule. The numerous added equipment and consumables for the day-long mission boosted the weight of Faith 7 considerably; it now weighed over 3,000 pounds (1,400 kg).

On March 15, the Atlas was rolled out of the factory a second time and passed tests with flying colors; Convair engineers expressed confidence that this "was their best bird yet." The booster actuators were offset slightly to prevent a recurrence of the liftoff roll transient that occurred on Mercury-Atlas 8. Several minor modifications were made to 130D as a result of postflight findings from failed Atlas launches over the previous year. These included adding a plastic liner to the inside of the turbopumps to prevent the turbine blades from rubbing against the casing and triggering an explosion from a friction spark, improvements to the wiring of the programmer, and additional steps taken to prevent the possibility of a fire breaking out in or around the thrust section.

The upgraded MA-2 engines featured baffled injector heads and a hypergolic igniter, eliminating any concerns of rough combustion or the need for hold-down time prior to liftoff. As such, the RCC (Rough Combustion Cutoff) sensors on 130D were operated open loop and for qualitative purposes only. The propellant conserved by not performing the three second hold-down time would allow a longer booster burn. On Mercury-Atlas 8, 112 gallons of fuel were removed prior to launch and so an extended burn was not possible even with eliminating the hold-down, but on this flight there would be enough propellant to extend burn time.

== Mission highlights ==
On April 22, 1963, Atlas booster 130-D and Mercury spacecraft #20 were stacked on the launch pad at Launch Complex 14.

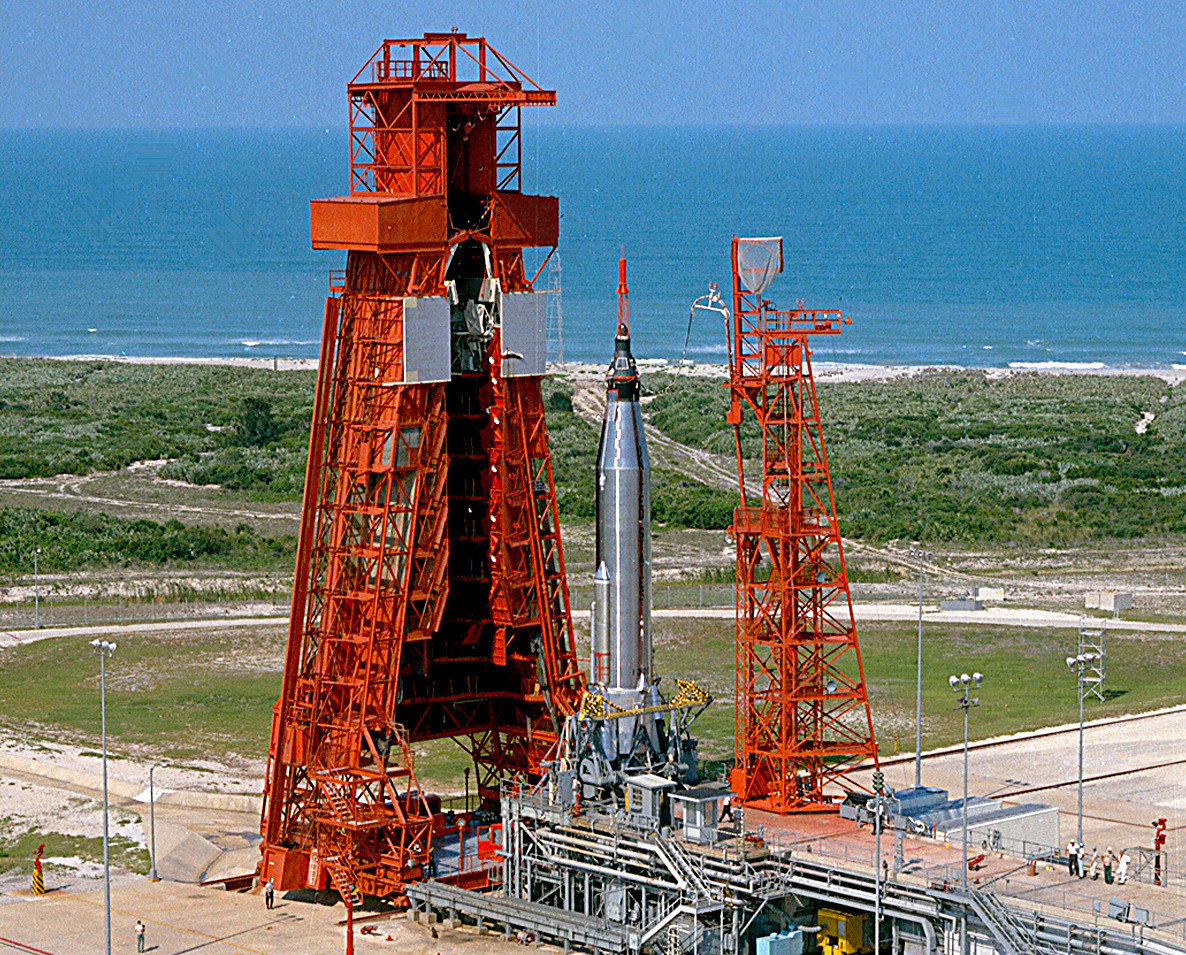
The Atlas booster and Faith 7 spacecraft on Launch Complex 14

When Cooper boarded Faith 7 at 6:36 AM on the morning of May 14, he found a little gift that had been left for him. Alan Shepard, knowing that Cooper would have a new version of the urine containment device that Shepard did not have on his Mercury-Redstone 3 flight (forcing him to relieve himself during a long countdown hold), had left behind a suction-cup pump as a joke. Instructions on the handle said, "Remove Before Launch". The gift did not make the trip. Neither did Cooper that day. Various problems with radar in Bermuda and the diesel engine that rolled back the gantry caused the launch to be cancelled until May 15.

=== Launch ===
At 8:04:13 a.m. EST, May 15, 1963, Faith 7 was launched from Launch Complex 14. At T+60 seconds, the Atlas started its pitch program. Shortly afterward, MA-9 passed through max Q. At T+2 minutes 14 seconds Cooper felt BECO (Booster Engine Cutoff) and staging. The two Atlas booster engines had been left behind. The Launch Escape Tower was then jettisoned. At T+3 minutes the cabin pressure sealed at 5.5 psi (38 kPa). Cooper reported, "Faith 7 is all go."

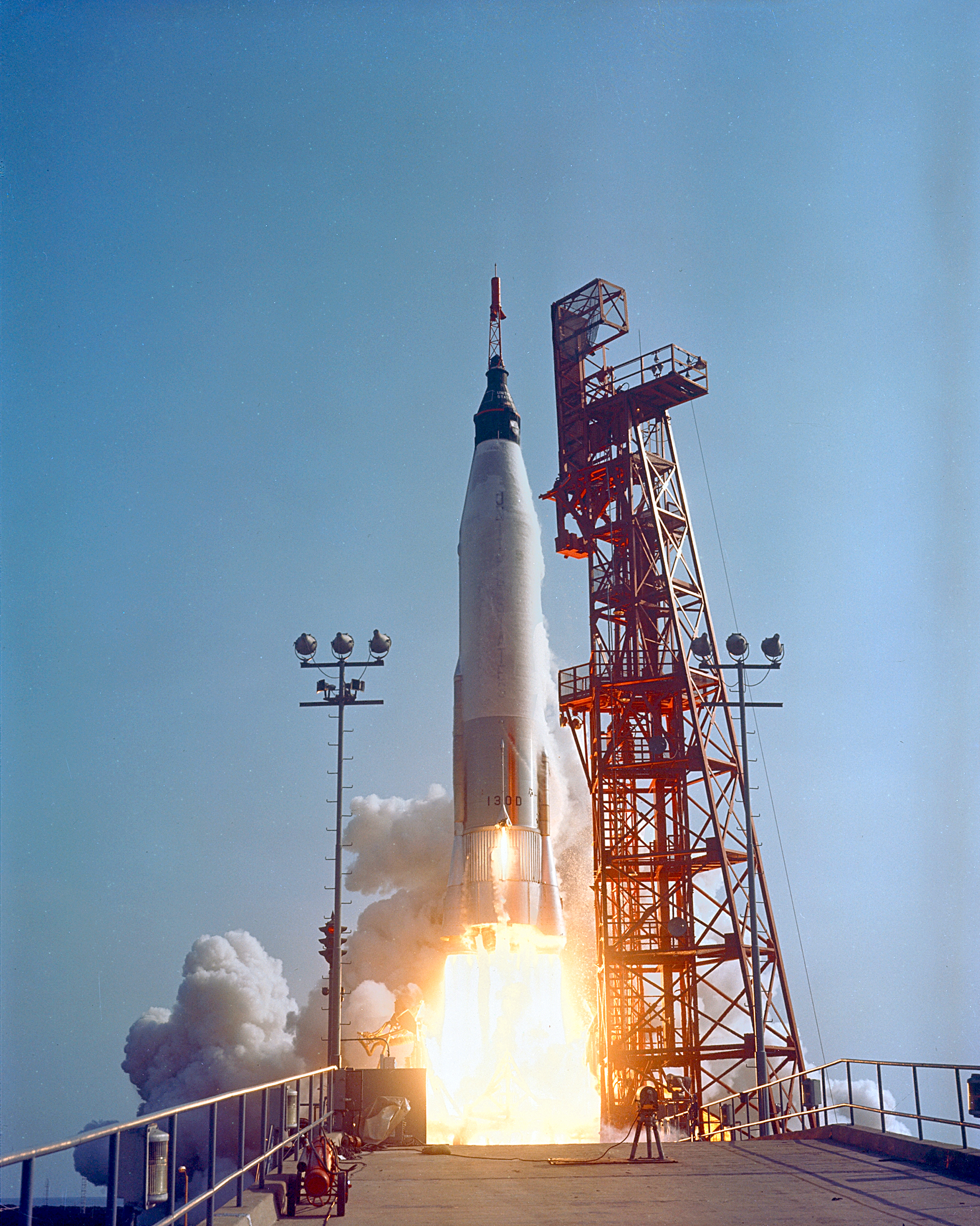
Lift off of MA-9

At about T+5 minutes was SECO (Sustainer Engine Cutoff) and Faith 7 entered orbit at 17,547 mph (7,844 m/s). After the spacecraft separated and turned around to orbit attitude, Cooper watched the spent Atlas lag behind and tumble for about eight minutes. Over Zanzibar on the first orbit, he learned that the orbital parameters were good enough for at least 20 orbits. As the spacecraft passed over Guaymas, Mexico still on the first orbit, capsule communicator Gus Grissom told Cooper the ground computers said he was "go for seven orbits."

Atlas performance was overall excellent. The upgraded propulsion system worked well, with slightly above nominal booster engine thrust. Measurable propellant slosh occurred from T+55 to T+120 seconds, caused by slightly lower than nominal autopilot gains. The flight trajectory was slightly more lofted than nominal due to the DC voltage in the booster electrical system being about 0.7 volts above normal, but this was counteracted by the higher than nominal booster engine performance. BECO took place at T+132 seconds, escape tower jettison at T+141 seconds, and SECO at T+303 seconds.

=== In-orbit activities ===
At the start of the third orbit, Cooper checked his list of 11 experiments that were on his schedule. His first task was to eject a six-inch (152 mm) diameter sphere, equipped with xenon strobe lights, from the nose of the spacecraft. This experiment was designed to test his ability to spot and track a flashing beacon in orbit. At T+3 hours 25 minutes, Cooper flipped the switch and heard and felt the beacon detach from the spacecraft. He tried to see the flashing light in the approaching dusk and on the nightside pass, but failed to do so. On the fourth orbit, he did spot the beacon and saw it pulsing. Cooper reported to Scott Carpenter on Kauai, Hawaii, "I was with the little rascal all night." He also spotted the beacon on his fifth and sixth orbits.

Also on the sixth orbit, at about T+9 hours, Cooper set up cameras, adjusted the spacecraft attitude and set switches to deploy a tethered balloon from the nose of the spacecraft. It was a 30-inch (762 mm) PET film balloon painted fluorescent orange, inflated with nitrogen and attached to a 100-foot (30 m) nylon line from the antenna canister. A strain gauge in the antenna canister would measure differences in atmospheric drag between the 100-mile (160 km) perigee and the 160-mile (260 km) apogee. Cooper tried several times to eject the balloon, but it failed to eject.

Cooper passed Schirra's orbital record on the seventh orbit while he was engaged in radiation experiments. After 10 hours, the Zanzibar tracking station informed Cooper the flight was a go for 17 orbits. Cooper was orbiting the Earth every 88 minutes 45 seconds at an inclination of 32.55 degrees to the equator.

His scheduled rest period was during orbits 9 through 13. He had a dinner of powdered roast beef mush and some water, took pictures of Asia and reported the spacecraft condition. Cooper was not sleepy and during orbit 9 took some of the best photos made during his flight. He took pictures of the Tibetan highlands and of the Himalayas.

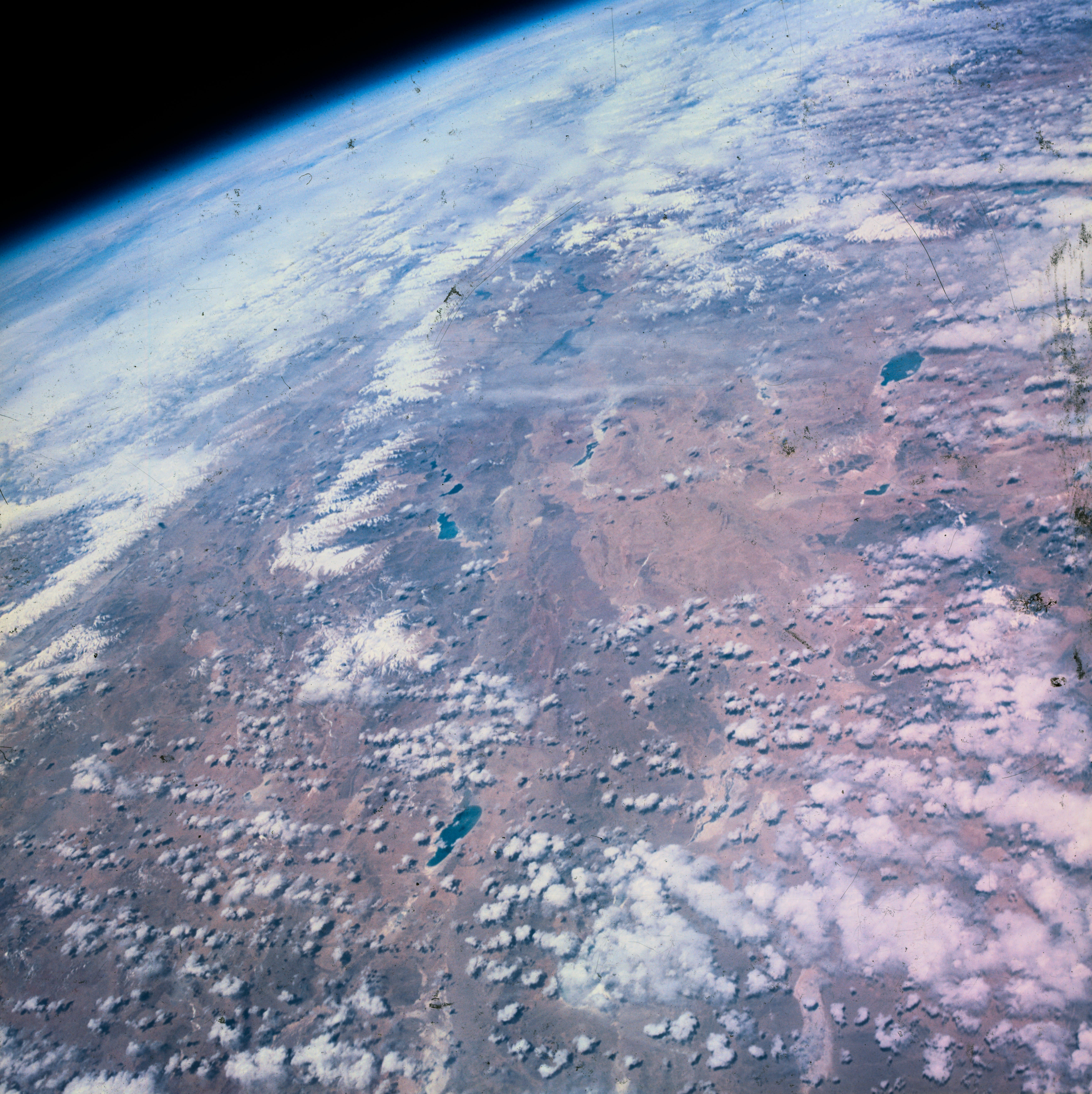
Picture of Tibet taken by Cooper

During the flight Cooper reported that he could see roads, rivers, small villages, and even individual houses if the lighting and background conditions were right. This was later confirmed by the two-person Gemini crews (which included Cooper). Cooper slept intermittently the next six hours, during orbits 10 through 13. He woke from time to time and took more pictures, taped status reports, and kept adjusting his spacesuit temperature control which kept getting too hot or too cold.

On his fourteenth orbit, Cooper took an assessment of the spacecraft condition. The oxygen supply was sufficient. The peroxide fuel for attitude control was 69 percent in the automatic tank and 95 percent in the manual one. On the fifteenth orbit, he spent most of the time calibrating equipment and synchronizing clocks.

When he entered night on the sixteenth orbit, Cooper pitched the spacecraft to slowly follow the plane of the ecliptic. Through the spacecraft window he viewed the zodiacal light and night airglow layer. He took pictures of these two "dim light" phenomena from Zanzibar, across the Earth's nightside, to Canton Island. The pictures were later found to have been overexposed, but they still contained valuable data. Cooper obtained photographs of North Africa, the Arabian peninsula, and eastern India, Burma, and the Himalaya region, as well as a few images of the Pacific and Indian Ocean.

Worldwide weather conditions during the flight were extremely favorable with most of the regions of the Earth the spacecraft passed over dominated by high pressure zones—in the three previous flights, only the Western Sahara and Southwestern United States were reliably cloudless. Nonetheless, haze and air pollution impeded visibility for Cooper—despite passing over Los Angeles and Calcutta, he could see neither city due to smog.

At the start of the 17th orbit while crossing Cape Canaveral, Florida, Cooper transmitted slow scan black and white television pictures to Mercury Control. The picture showed a ghostly image of the astronaut. In the murky picture, a helmet and hoses could be seen. It was the first time an American astronaut had sent back television images from space.

On the 17th and 18th orbits, Cooper took infrared weather photos and moonset Earth-limb pictures. He also resumed Geiger counter measurements of radiation. He sang during orbits 18 and 19, and marveled at the greenery of Earth. It was nearing 30 hours since liftoff.

=== Technical issues during the flight ===
On the 19th orbit, the first sign of trouble appeared when the spacecraft 0.05 g (0.5 m/s^{2}) light came on. However, this turned out to be a faulty indicator, and the spacecraft was not reentering. On the 20th orbit, Cooper lost all attitude readings. The 21st orbit saw a short-circuit occur in the bus bar serving the 250 VA (115 V, 400 Hz) main inverter. This left the automatic stabilization and control system without electric power.

On the 21st orbit, John Glenn on board the tracking ship Coastal Sentry Quebec near Kyushu, Japan, helped Cooper prepare a revised checklist for retrofire. Due to the system malfunctions, many of the steps would have to be done manually. Only Hawaii and Zanzibar were in radio range on this last orbit, but communications were good. Cooper noted that the carbon dioxide level was rising in the cabin and in his spacesuit. He told Carpenter as he passed over Zanzibar, "Things are beginning to stack up a little." Throughout the problems, Cooper remained cool, calm and collected.

Cooper did not experience much of an appetite during the flight and ate only because it was scheduled. The food containers and water dispenser system proved unwieldy and he was not able to properly prepare freeze-dried food packages, so he limited his consumption to cubed food and bite-sized sandwiches. Cooper found the cubed food largely unpalatable, which contributed to his lack of eating. He had no difficulty urinating during the flight and the urine collection system worked well, although transferring urine to storage bags in the cramped capsule proved difficult. Cooper took several naps during the flight, lasting about an hour each. He experienced some discomfort from the pressure suit compressing his knees, which he alleviated by moving his feet slightly upward. Some time before re-entry, Cooper complied with an order to consume a dextroamphetamine tablet to ensure his alertness; he reported not feeling any sleepiness for the remainder of the flight.

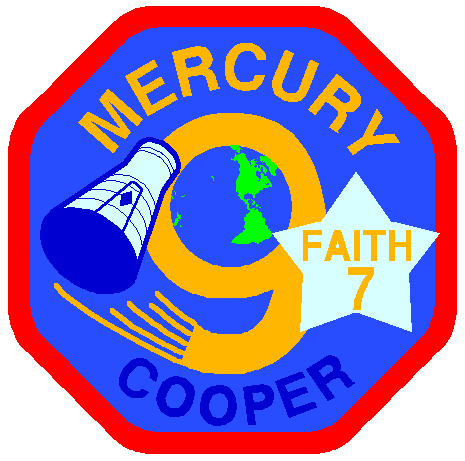
Mission insignia

=== Re-entry and splashdown ===
At the end of the 21st orbit, Cooper again contacted Glenn on Coastal Sentry Quebec. He reported the spacecraft was in retro attitude and holding manually. The checklist was complete. Glenn gave a ten-second countdown to retrofire. Cooper kept the spacecraft aligned at a 34° pitchdown angle and manually fired the retrorockets on "Mark!".

Cooper had drawn lines on the window to stay aligned with constellations as he flew the craft. He later said he used his wristwatch to time the burn and his eyes to maintain attitude.

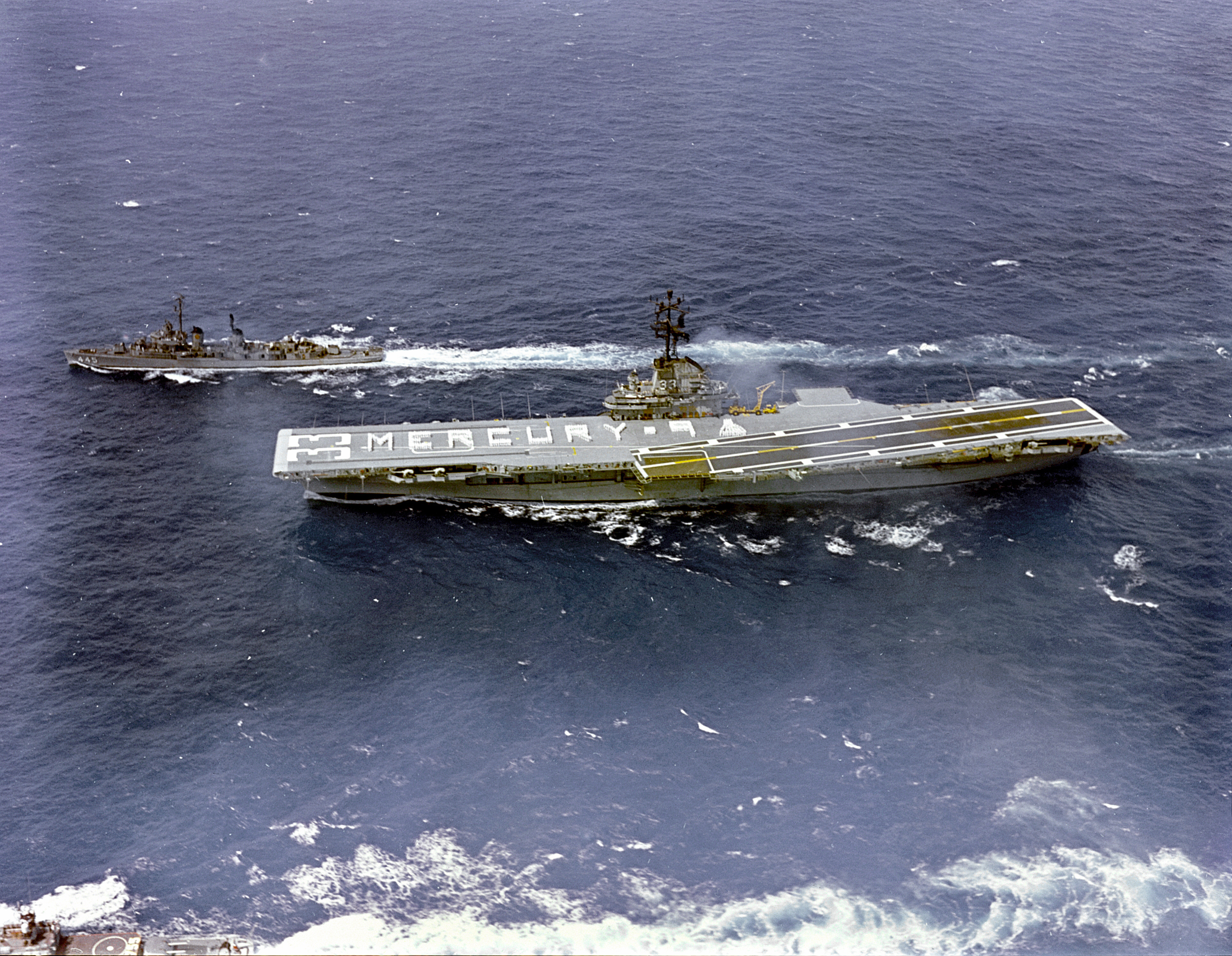
The crew of USS Kearsarge spells out "MERCURY 9" on the flight deck while underway to the recovery area

Fifteen minutes later Faith 7 landed just four miles (6 km) from the prime recovery ship, the carrier USS Kearsarge. This was the most accurate landing to date, despite the lack of automatic controls. Faith 7 landed 70 nautical miles (130 km) southeast of Midway Island, in the Pacific Ocean. This would be near 27°30′N 176°15′W.

Splashdown was at 34 hours 19 minutes 49 seconds after liftoff. The spacecraft tipped over in the water momentarily, then righted itself. Helicopters dropped rescue swimmers and relayed Cooper's request of an Air Force officer for permission to be hoisted aboard the Navy's carrier. Permission was granted. Forty minutes later the explosive hatch blew open on the deck of Kearsarge. Cooper stepped out of Faith 7 to a warm greeting.

== Post-mission ==
=== Medical checkup ===
Post-flight medical examination of Cooper found that he was slightly dehydrated and experienced a degree of orthostatic hypotension from being seated in the capsule an entire day, but other than that no significant effects from the flight were noted.

=== Recognition ===
Cooper was awarded the NASA Distinguished Service Medal by President John F. Kennedy at the White House on May 21, 1963. He also addressed a joint session of the U.S. Congress on the same day. Accomplishments of the Mercury 9 mission and Astronaut Gordon Cooper were celebrated in New York City with a ticker tape parade down the Canyon of Heroes (Broadway) on May 22, 1963, with millions turning out.

=== Mercury 10 mission ===
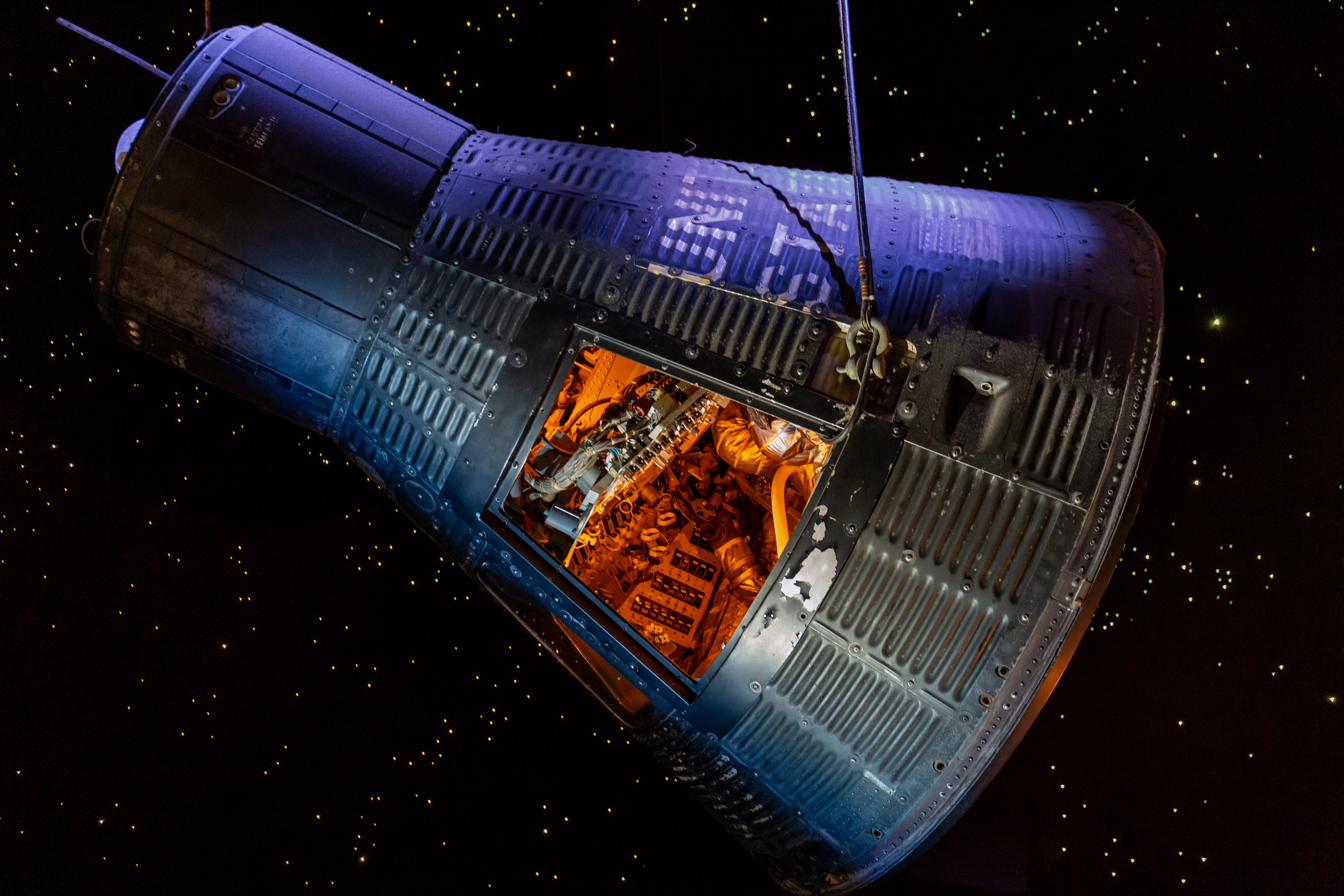
The Faith 7 capsule in 2018

After the MA-9 mission, there was another debate about whether to fly one more Mercury flight, Mercury-Atlas 10 (MA-10). It was proposed as a three-day, 48-orbit mission to be flown by Alan Shepard in October 1963. In the end, NASA officials decided it was time to move on to Project Gemini and MA-10 never flew.

The Mercury program had fulfilled all of its goals.

=== Spacecraft location ===
The Faith 7 spacecraft is currently displayed at Space Center Houston, Houston, Texas.
