= Meyersdale, Pennsylvania =

Borough in Pennsylvania, US

Borough of Meyersdale
- Borough
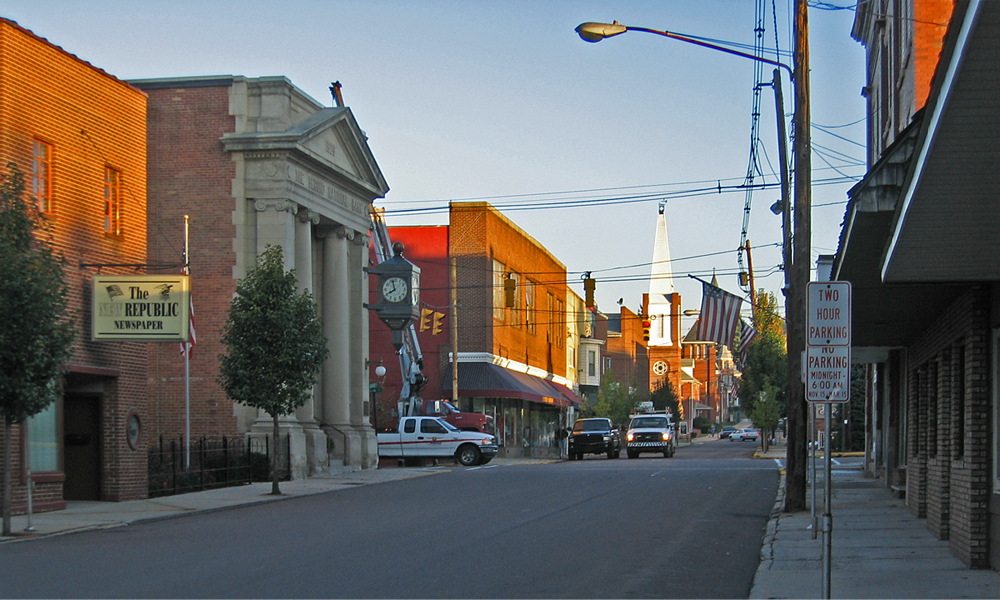
- Meyersdale in 2007
- Nickname: Maple City USA
- Location of Meyersdale in Somerset County, Pennsylvania.

- Meyersdale, Somerset County, Pennsylvania, USA
- Coordinates: 39°48′49″N 79°01′35″W
- Country: United States
- State: Pennsylvania
- County: Somerset County
- Settled: 1844
- Incorporated: 1871

Area
  - Total: 0.81 sq mi (2.11 km^{2})
  - Land: 0.81 sq mi (2.11 km^{2})
  - Water: 0 sq mi (0.00 km^{2})

Population (2020)
  - Total: 2,070
  - Density: 2,535.9/sq mi (979.13/km^{2})
- Time zone: UTC-5 (EST)
  - Summer (DST): UTC-4 (EDT)
- Zip Code: 15552
- Area code: 814
- FIPS code: 42-48912
- Website: https://meyersdaleborough.com/

Meyersdale is a borough in Somerset County, Pennsylvania, United States, situated on the Casselman River, 73 miles (117 km) southeast of Pittsburgh. It is part of the Johnstown, Pennsylvania, Metropolitan Statistical Area. As of the 2020 census, Meyersdale had a population of 2,070.

In the past, Meyersdale's chief industry was the mining of coal.

Meyersdale is located along the Great Allegheny Passage, a multi-use recreational rail trail.

The Pennsylvania Maple Festival has taken place each spring in Meyersdale since 1948. Consequently, Meyersdale is known as the Maple City.

Meyersdale is home to the Somerset County Fair.

== History ==
Meyersdale was first settled as early as 1776, but the growth of the town dates from the advent of the first railroad in 1871. Coal mining began in the next year.

The borough was named for an early settler: Peter Meyers, a local farmer who was integral to the beginning of the town. Early names for Meyersdale included Meyers Mills and Dale City. Jacob Olinger had 30 lots laid out on his land in 1844 with Alexander Philson of Berlin serving as the surveyor. Additional lots were laid out in 1852, with M.D. Miller acting as the surveyor, and in 1869, with Kenneth McCloud as surveyor. Around the same time, Peter Meyers had lots laid out on his land and the Beachley family had lots laid out on their land. The Olinger and Beachley lots were organized together in 1872 and named Dale City. The Meyers lots were added in 1874, and the name was changed to Meyersdale. The Amity Reformed Church was organized about 1851, and the Zion Evangelical Lutheran Church in 1852, and both congregations shared a union churchhouse from 1854 until 1875.

In 1981–82, Meyersdale received an All-America City Award from the National Civic League. The Meyersdale Wind Farm began commercial operations in 2003.

The New Colonial Hotel and Second National Bank of Meyersdale are listed on the National Register of Historic Places.

== Geography ==
According to the United States Census Bureau, the borough has a total area of 0.8 square miles (2.1 km^{2}), all land. Meyersdale is surrounded by Summit Township.

=== Climate ===
Climate data for Meyersdale 2 SSW, Pennsylvania, 1991–2020 normals: 2000ft (610m)
Month	Jan	Feb	Mar	Apr	May	Jun	Jul	Aug	Sep	Oct	Nov	Dec	Year
Record high °F (°C)	68 (20)	75 (24)	78 (26)	86 (30)	89 (32)	92 (33)	92 (33)	90 (32)	90 (32)	86 (30)	78 (26)	72 (22)	92 (33)
Mean maximum °F (°C)	59.5 (15.3)	59.7 (15.4)	69.3 (20.7)	79.6 (26.4)	83.2 (28.4)	85.9 (29.9)	86.9 (30.5)	86.4 (30.2)	85.1 (29.5)	78.7 (25.9)	71.6 (22.0)	61.2 (16.2)	88.1 (31.2)
Mean daily maximum °F (°C)	34.4 (1.3)	37.6 (3.1)	45.8 (7.7)	58.7 (14.8)	67.8 (19.9)	75.8 (24.3)	79.5 (26.4)	78.5 (25.8)	73.2 (22.9)	61.1 (16.2)	49.3 (9.6)	38.9 (3.8)	58.4 (14.7)
Daily mean °F (°C)	25.5 (−3.6)	27.2 (−2.7)	34.7 (1.5)	45.9 (7.7)	55.5 (13.1)	63.9 (17.7)	67.9 (19.9)	66.4 (19.1)	60.4 (15.8)	48.9 (9.4)	38.6 (3.7)	30.1 (−1.1)	47.1 (8.4)
Mean daily minimum °F (°C)	16.7 (−8.5)	16.7 (−8.5)	23.6 (−4.7)	33.0 (0.6)	43.1 (6.2)	52.0 (11.1)	56.3 (13.5)	54.4 (12.4)	47.7 (8.7)	36.6 (2.6)	27.8 (−2.3)	21.3 (−5.9)	35.8 (2.1)
Mean minimum °F (°C)	−5.7 (−20.9)	−3.5 (−19.7)	5.8 (−14.6)	20.1 (−6.6)	28.8 (−1.8)	39.1 (3.9)	45.4 (7.4)	44.7 (7.1)	35.5 (1.9)	24.1 (−4.4)	13.7 (−10.2)	3.6 (−15.8)	−9.4 (−23.0)
Record low °F (°C)	−17 (−27)	−21 (−29)	−9 (−23)	13 (−11)	21 (−6)	31 (−1)	39 (4)	40 (4)	30 (−1)	18 (−8)	4 (−16)	−7 (−22)	−21 (−29)
Average precipitation inches (mm)	3.01 (76)	2.70 (69)	3.65 (93)	3.53 (90)	4.35 (110)	4.34 (110)	4.11 (104)	3.67 (93)	3.62 (92)	2.98 (76)	2.66 (68)	3.06 (78)	41.68 (1,059)
Average snowfall inches (cm)	12.90 (32.8)	11.40 (29.0)	9.90 (25.1)	1.10 (2.8)	0.00 (0.00)	0.00 (0.00)	0.00 (0.00)	0.00 (0.00)	0.00 (0.00)	0.70 (1.8)	2.80 (7.1)	6.90 (17.5)	45.7 (116.1)
Source 1: NOAA
Source 2: XMACIS (temp records & monthly max/mins)

== Demographics ==
Historical population
Census	Pop.	Note	%±
1880	1,423		—
1890	1,847		29.8%
1900	3,024		63.7%
1910	3,741		23.7%
1920	3,716		−0.7%
1930	3,065		−17.5%
1940	3,250		6.0%
1950	3,137		−3.5%
1960	2,901		−7.5%
1970	2,648		−8.7%
1980	2,581		−2.5%
1990	2,518		−2.4%
2000	2,473		−1.8%
2010	2,184		−11.7%
2020	2,070		−5.2%
2021 (est.)	2,049	▼	−1.0%

At the 2000 census there were 2,473 people, 1,019 households, and 666 families residing in the borough. The population density was 2,950.7 inhabitants per square mile (1,139.3/km^{2}). There were 1,089 housing units at an average density of 1,299.3 per square mile (501.7/km^{2}). The racial makeup of the borough was 99.35% White, 0.24% African American, 0.12% Native American, 0.16% Asian, and 0.12% from two or more races. Hispanic or Latino of any race were 0.73%.

Of the 1,019 households, 29.4% had children under the age of 18 living with them, 49.2% were married couples living together, 11.4% had a female householder with no husband present, and 34.6% were non-families. Individuals made up 31.0% of all households, and 18.1% consisted of a single person aged 65 or older. The average household size was 2.31, while the average family size was 2.89.

The population was distributed across age groups as follows: 22.2% were under 18, 7.5% were aged 18 to 24, 26.4% were between 25 and 44, 21.8% were between 45 and 64, and 22.1% were 65 or older. The median age was 41 years. There were 84.7 males for every 100 females, and among those aged 18 and over, there were 80.9 males per 100 females.

The median household income was $24,652, and the median family income was $29,798. Males had a median income of $26,167, compared with $18,205 for females. The per capita income for the borough was $14,116. About 16.8% of families and 20.4% of the population were below the poverty line, including 31.4% of those under age 18 and 18.3% of those age 65 or over.

== Education ==
The community is served by the Meyersdale Area School District. Senior students attend Meyersdale Area High School.

== Notable people ==
- Harry Beal, the first U.S. Navy Seal. A bridge in Meyersdale was named in his honor in 2020.
- Bill Collins, professional golfer.
- William P. Kephart, US Naval Reserve aviator killed in action over Guadalcanal. The USS Kephart is named in his honor.
- George H. Ramer, received the Medal of Honor—America's highest military award—for his actions during the Korean War.
- John Charles Thomas, opera, operetta and concert baritone.
- Thomas G. Saylor, Chief Justice of the Pennsylvania Supreme Court.
