= Mercury-Atlas 6 =

First American orbital spaceflight

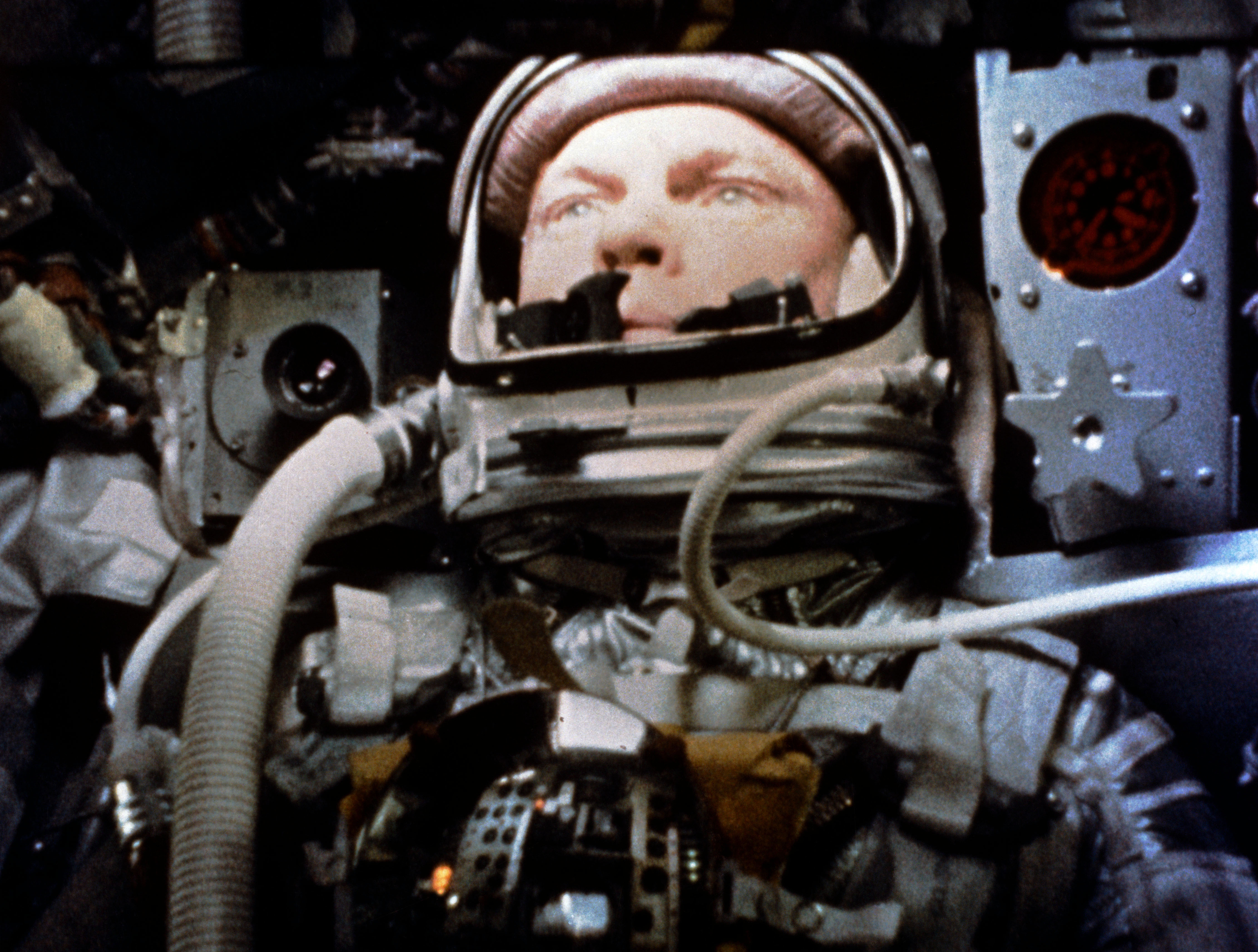
- Still frame of John Glenn in orbit, taken by a motion picture camera inside Friendship 7
- Mission type: Test flight
- Operator: NASA
- Harvard designation: 1962 Gamma 1
- COSPAR ID: 1962-003A
- SATCAT no.: 240
- Mission duration: 4 hours, 55 minutes, 23 seconds
- Distance travelled: 65,763 nautical miles (121,793 km)
- Orbits completed: 3

Spacecraft properties
- Spacecraft: Mercury No.13
- Manufacturer: McDonnell Aircraft
- Launch mass: 2,981 pounds (1,352 kg)

Crew
- Crew size: 1
- Members: John H. Glenn, Jr
- Callsign: Friendship 7

Start of mission
- Launch date: February 20, 1962, 14:47:39 UTC
- Rocket: Atlas LV-3B 109-D
- Launch site: Cape Canaveral LC-14

End of mission
- Recovered by: USS Noa
- Landing date: February 20, 1962, 19:43:02 UTC
- Landing site: North Atlantic Ocean; 21°20′N 68°40′W

Orbital parameters
- Reference system: Geocentric
- Regime: Low Earth orbit
- Perigee altitude: 80 nautical miles (150 km)
- Apogee altitude: 134 nautical miles (248 km)
- Inclination: 32.5 degrees
- Period: 88.47 minutes
- Epoch: February 20, 1962
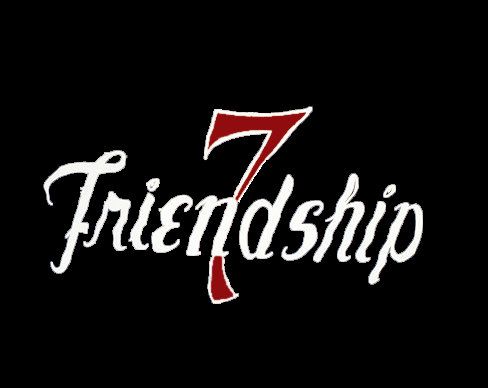
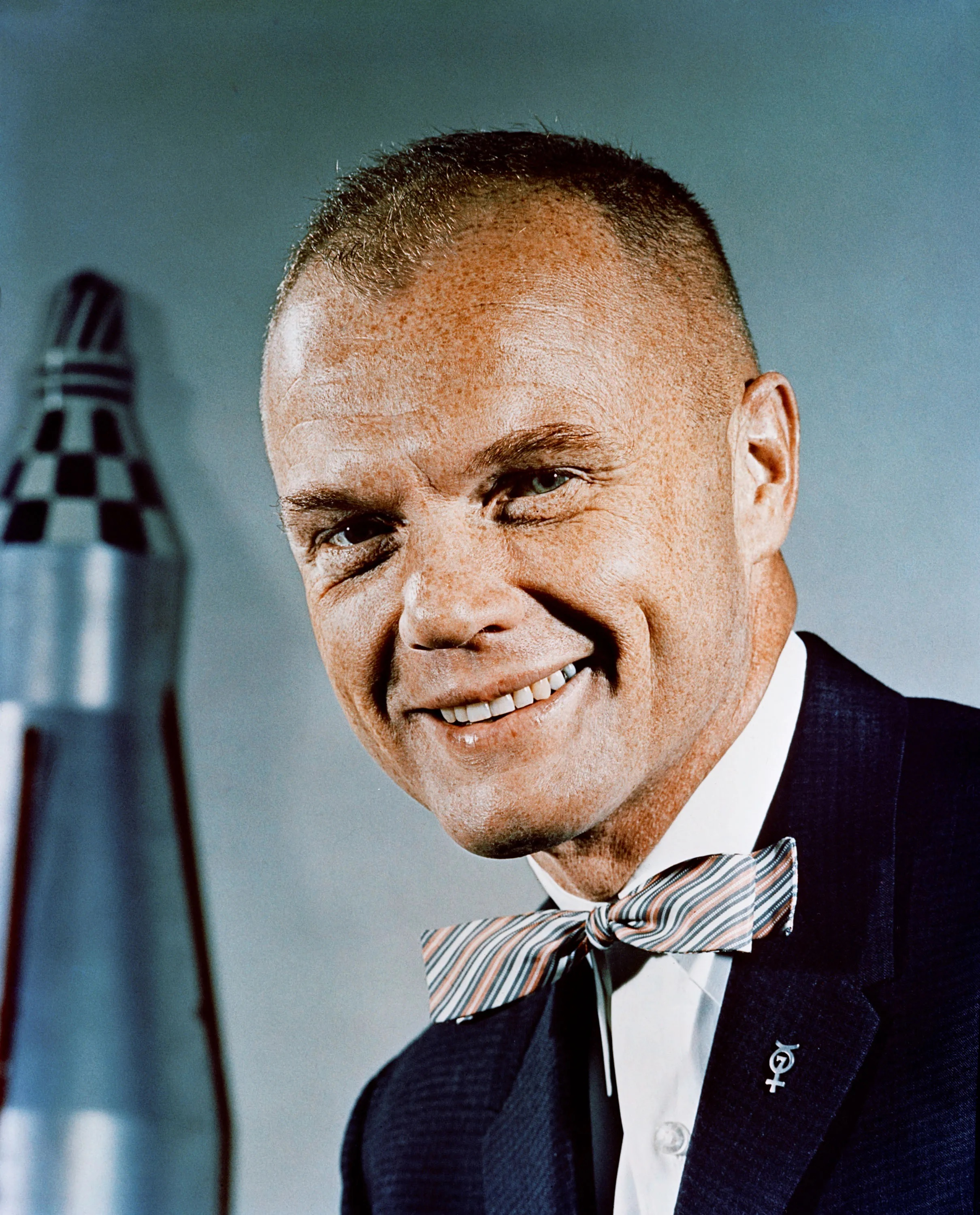
- Spacecraft name as painted on the capsule side John Herschel Glenn Jr. Project Mercury; Crewed missions

Mercury-Atlas 6 (MA-6) was the first crewed American orbital spaceflight, which took place on February 20, 1962. Piloted by astronaut John Glenn and operated by NASA as part of Project Mercury, it was the fifth human spaceflight, preceded by Soviet orbital flights Vostok 1 and 2 and American sub-orbital flights Mercury-Redstone 3 and 4.

The Mercury spacecraft, named Friendship 7, was carried to orbit by an Atlas LV-3B launch vehicle lifting off from Launch Complex 14 at Cape Canaveral, Florida. After three orbits, the spacecraft re-entered the Earth's atmosphere, splashed down in the North Atlantic Ocean, and was safely taken aboard USS Noa. The total mission flight time was 4 hours 55 minutes and 23 seconds.

== Preparation ==
After the successful completion of the Mercury-Atlas 5 flight that carried Enos, a chimpanzee, in late November 1961, a press conference was held in early December. Reporters asked NASA's Robert Gilruth who would be the first U.S. astronaut in orbit, piloting MA-6. He then announced the team members for the next two Mercury missions. John H. Glenn was selected as prime pilot for the first mission (MA-6), with M. Scott Carpenter as his backup. Donald K. Slayton and Walter M. Schirra were pilot and backup, respectively, for the second mission, Mercury-Atlas 7.

The MA-6 launch vehicle, Atlas #109-D, arrived at Cape Canaveral the evening of November 30, 1961. NASA had wanted to launch MA-6 in 1961 (hoping to orbit an astronaut in the same calendar year as the Soviets did), but by early December it was apparent that the mission hardware would not be ready for launch until early 1962.

Mercury spacecraft #13 began taking form on McDonnell's St. Louis, Missouri assembly line in May 1960. It was chosen for the MA-6 mission in October 1960 and delivered to Cape Canaveral on August 27, 1961. Mercury spacecraft #13 and Atlas #109-D were stacked on the pad at Launch Complex 14 on January 2, 1962.

As the effects of orbital space flight on humans were unknown except to the Soviets, who were keeping whatever knowledge they had a secret, Glenn was prepared with an onboard medical kit consisting of morphine for pain relief, mephentermine sulfate to treat any shock symptoms, benzylamine hydrochloride to counter motion sickness and racemic amphetamine sulfate, a stimulant. A survival kit was also placed on board to assist Glenn while waiting for recovery after splashdown, including desalter kits, dye marker, distress signal, signal mirrors, signal whistle, first aid kits, shark chaser, a PK-2 raft, survival rations, matches, and a radio transceiver. In addition, due to the lessons learnt from the previous two manned flights, MA-6 was the first American spaceflight to include a dedicated urine collection device.

Prior to MA-6, there had been a reluctance on the part of NASA to permit the use of cameras by astronauts as it was feared these might prove an unnecessary distraction. Glenn, however, was successful in persuading NASA that he should be allowed to take one on the mission, and a Minolta Hi-Matic (Note: In US this was sold as the Ansco Autoset.) 35mm film camera (which he purchased himself at a local drug store) duly made the trip into orbit. This was modified to be used with pressure suit gloves, although changing the film in a weightless environment proved a difficult operation and during the flight Glenn knocked a film canister which then floated away, ending up behind the instrument panel.

== Naming ==
Glenn dubbed his capsule "Friendship 7", the seven in honor of the seven original astronauts selected for Mercury, a tradition inadvertently started by prior Mercury pilot, Alan Shepard, who incorporated the seven in "Freedom 7" as his spacecraft was factory model no. 7. The other astronauts liked the symbolism, and so each appended 7 to their spacecraft names as well. The spacecraft nose art was hand painted by Cece Bibby.

The spacecraft's name was developed democratically, with Glenn, his wife, Annie, and their children all participating in the process, consulting dictionaries and a thesaurus for possibilities.

"We played around with Liberty, Independence, a lot of them. The more I thought about it, the more I leaned toward the name Friendship. Flying around the world, over all those countries, that was the message I wanted to convey. In the end, that was the name the kids liked best, too. I was real proud of them." John Glenn

== Flight ==
=== Delays ===
The launch date was first announced as January 16, 1962, then postponed to January 20 because of problems with the Atlas rocket fuel tanks. A faulty yaw gyro was detected by the Spin Motor Rotation Detection System and replaced on January 13. The launch then slipped day by day to January 27 due to unfavorable winter weather. On that day, Glenn was on board Mercury 6 and ready to launch, when, at T−29 minutes, the flight director called off the launch because of thick clouds that would have made it impossible to photograph or film the launch vehicle after the first 20 seconds of the mission (the inability of launch crews to film the failed Mercury-Atlas 1 launch 16 months earlier had proven the importance of flying only in clear skies). The large crowd of reporters gathered at Cape Canaveral for the launch went home, disappointed. Mission Director Walter Williams felt a sense of relief at the bad weather, as there was still a general sense that the spacecraft and booster were not ready to fly yet.

NASA informed the anxious public that the mission would take time to get ready since crewed launches required a high degree of preparation and safety standards. The launch was postponed until February 1, but when technicians began to fuel the Atlas on January 30, they discovered a fuel leak had soaked an internal insulation blanket between the RP-1 and LOX tanks. This caused a two-week delay while necessary repairs were made. On February 14, the launch was again postponed due to weather, which started to break on February 18, and it appeared that February 20 would be a favorable day to attempt a launch.

The Flight Safety Review Board then met a few days before the launch to overview the twelve Atlas flights since Mercury-Atlas 5 last November. Four failures had occurred in this time. Atlas 5F and Ranger 3 had guidance failures that were of no concern for Mercury as it used a different model of guidance system and Atlas 6F and Samos 5 had random quality defects unlikely to be an issue on the more tightly supervised Mercury program.

=== Launch ===
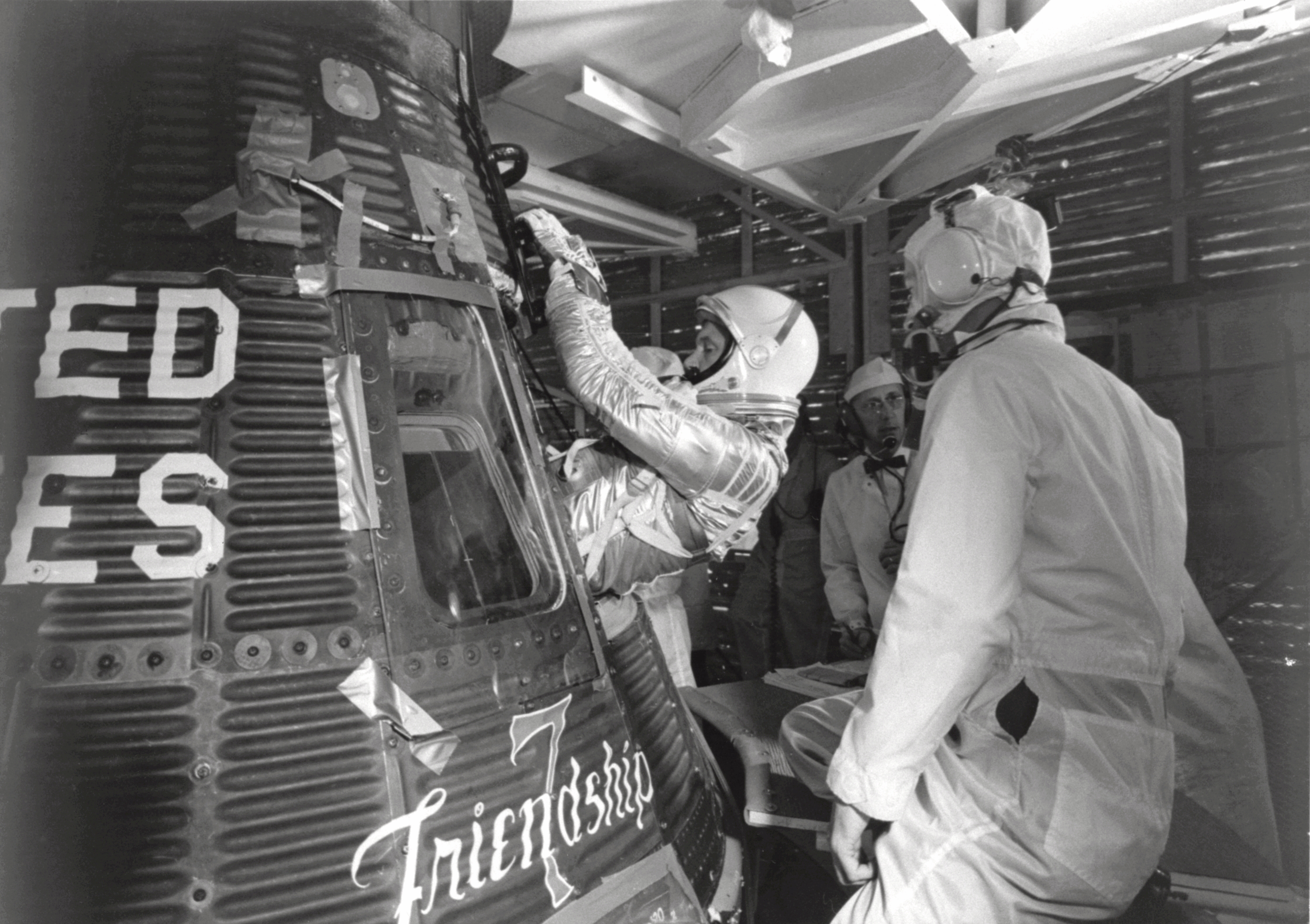
Glenn entering Friendship 7

Glenn boarded the Friendship 7 spacecraft at 11:03 UTC on February 20 following an hour-and-a-half delay to replace a faulty component in the Atlas's guidance system. The hatch was bolted in place at 12:10 UTC. Most of the 70 hatch bolts had been secured, when one was discovered to be broken. This caused a 42-minute delay while all the bolts were removed, the defective bolt was replaced and the hatch was re-bolted in place. The count was resumed at 11:25 UTC, and the gantry was rolled back at 13:20 UTC. At 13:58 UTC the count was held for 25 minutes while a liquid oxygen propellant valve was repaired.

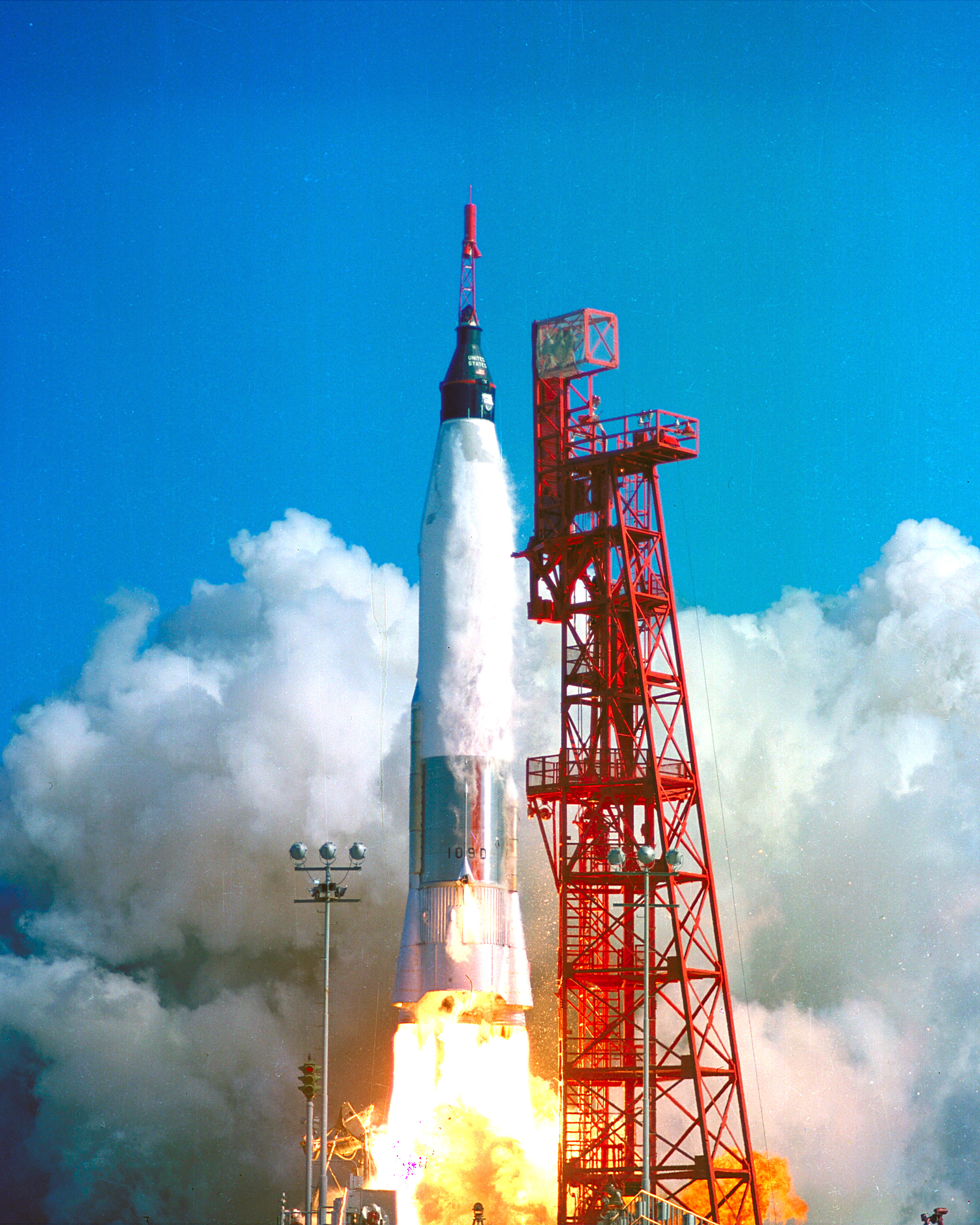
Launch of Friendship 7

The launch was seen by millions of people on TV.

At 14:47 UTC, after two hours and 17 minutes of holds and three hours and 44 minutes after Glenn entered Friendship 7, engineer T. J. O'Malley pressed the button in the blockhouse launching the spacecraft. O'Malley said, "the good Lord ride all the way," and then capsule communicator Scott Carpenter uttered the famous phrase "Godspeed, John Glenn." Due to a glitch in Glenn's radio, he did not hear the Carpenter phrase during launch. At liftoff Glenn's pulse rate climbed to 110 beats per minute.

Thirty seconds after liftoff, the General Electric-Burroughs designed guidance system locked onto a radio transponder in the booster to guide the vehicle to orbit. As the Atlas and Friendship 7 passed through max Q Glenn reported, "Have some vibration area coming up here now." After max Q the flight smoothed out. At two minutes and 14 seconds after launch, the booster engines cut off and dropped away. Then at two minutes and twenty-four seconds, the escape tower was jettisoned, right on schedule.

After the tower was jettisoned, the Atlas and spacecraft pitched over still further, giving Glenn his first view of the horizon. He described the view as "a beautiful sight, looking eastward across the Atlantic". Vibration increased as the last of the fuel supply was used up. Booster performance had been nearly flawless through the entire powered flight. At sustainer engine cut-off, it was found that the Atlas had accelerated the capsule to a speed only 7 ft/s (2.1 m/s) below nominal. At 14:52 UTC, Friendship 7 was in orbit. Glenn received word that the Atlas had boosted the MA-6 into a trajectory that would stay up for at least seven orbits. Meanwhile, computers at the Goddard Space Flight Center in Maryland indicated that the MA-6 orbital parameters appeared good enough for almost 100 orbits.

=== First orbit ===
When the posigrade rockets fired and separated the capsule from the booster, the five-second rate-damping operation started two and a half seconds late. This caused a substantial roll error as the capsule began its turnaround. The automatic attitude control system took 38 seconds to place Friendship 7 into its proper orbital attitude. The turnaround maneuver used 5.4 pounds (2.4 kg) of fuel from a total supply of 60.4 pounds (27.4 kg): 36 lb (16 kg) for automatic and 24.4 lb (11.1 kg) for manual control system. The spacecraft then settled into orbital flight with a velocity of 17,544 miles per hour (28,234 km/h).

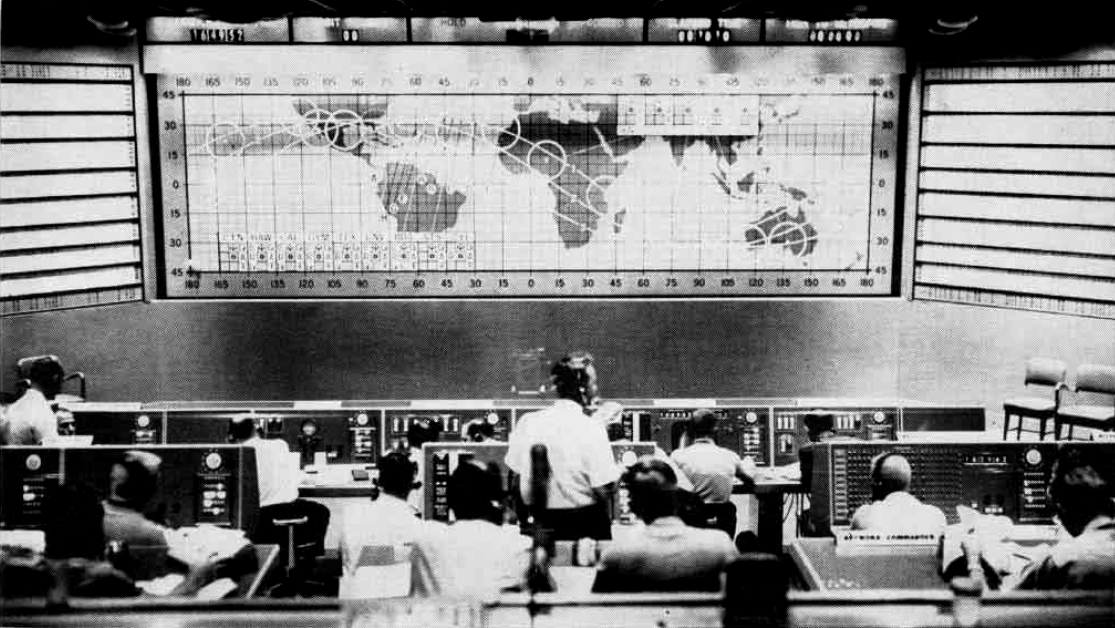
View of Mission Control (called "Mercury Control" at the time) during the Mercury-Atlas 6 mission

Friendship 7 began its first orbit with all systems go. It crossed the Atlantic and passed over the Canary Islands. Controllers there reported all capsule systems in perfect working order. Looking at the African coastline, and later the interior over Kano, Nigeria, Glenn told the tracking station team that he could see a dust storm. Kano flight communicators replied that the winds had been quite heavy for the past week.

Over Kano, Glenn took control of the spacecraft and started a major yaw adjustment. He allowed the spacecraft to continue the yaw maneuver until it was facing into its flight path. Glenn noticed that the attitude indicators disagreed with what he observed was the true spacecraft attitude. Even with the incorrect instrument readouts, he was pleased to be facing forward instead of backward on his orbital path.

Over the Indian Ocean, Glenn observed his first sunset from orbit. He described the moment of twilight as "beautiful". The sky in space was very black, he said, with a thin band of blue along the horizon. He said the sun set fast, but not as quickly as he had expected. For five or six minutes there was a slow reduction in light intensity. Brilliant orange and blue layers spread out 45 to 60 degrees on either side of the sun, tapering gradually toward the horizon. Clouds prevented him from seeing a mortar flare fired by the Indian Ocean tracking ship as part of a pilot observation experiment.

Continuing his journey on the night side of Earth, nearing the Australian coastline, Glenn made star, weather, and landmark observations. He looked for but failed to see the dim light phenomenon known as the zodiacal light; his eyes had insufficient time to adapt to the darkness.

The spacecraft came into radio range of Muchea, Australia. At the Mercury Tracking Station there, Gordon Cooper was the capsule communicator. Glenn reported that he felt fine and had no problems. He saw a very bright light and what appeared to be the outline of a city. Cooper said that he probably was looking at the lights of Perth and its satellite town of Rockingham. This turned out to be correct; many people in Perth turned on their lights so as to be visible to Glenn as he passed over. "That sure was a short day," he excitedly told Cooper. "That was about the shortest day I've ever run into."

The spacecraft moved across Australia and across the Pacific to Canton Island. Glenn experienced a short 45 minute night and prepared the periscope for viewing his first sunrise from orbit. As the sun rose over the island, he saw thousands of "little specks, brilliant specks, floating around outside the capsule"; he momentarily felt that the spacecraft was tumbling or that he was looking into a star field. A quick hard look out of the spacecraft window corrected the illusion and Glenn was sure that the "fireflies", as he called them, were streaming past his spacecraft from ahead. They seemed to flow by slowly but did not seem to be coming from any part of the spacecraft, and they disappeared as Friendship 7 moved into brighter sunlight. It was later determined that they were probably small ice crystals venting from onboard spacecraft systems.

"I am in a big mass of some very small particles, they're brilliantly lit up like they're luminescent. I never saw anything like it. They round a little: they're coming by the capsule and they look like little stars. A whole shower of them coming by. They swirl around the capsule and go in front of the window and they're all brilliantly lighted." Glenn started banging the capsule wall and watched the "fireflies" come off, just as Alan Shepard did.

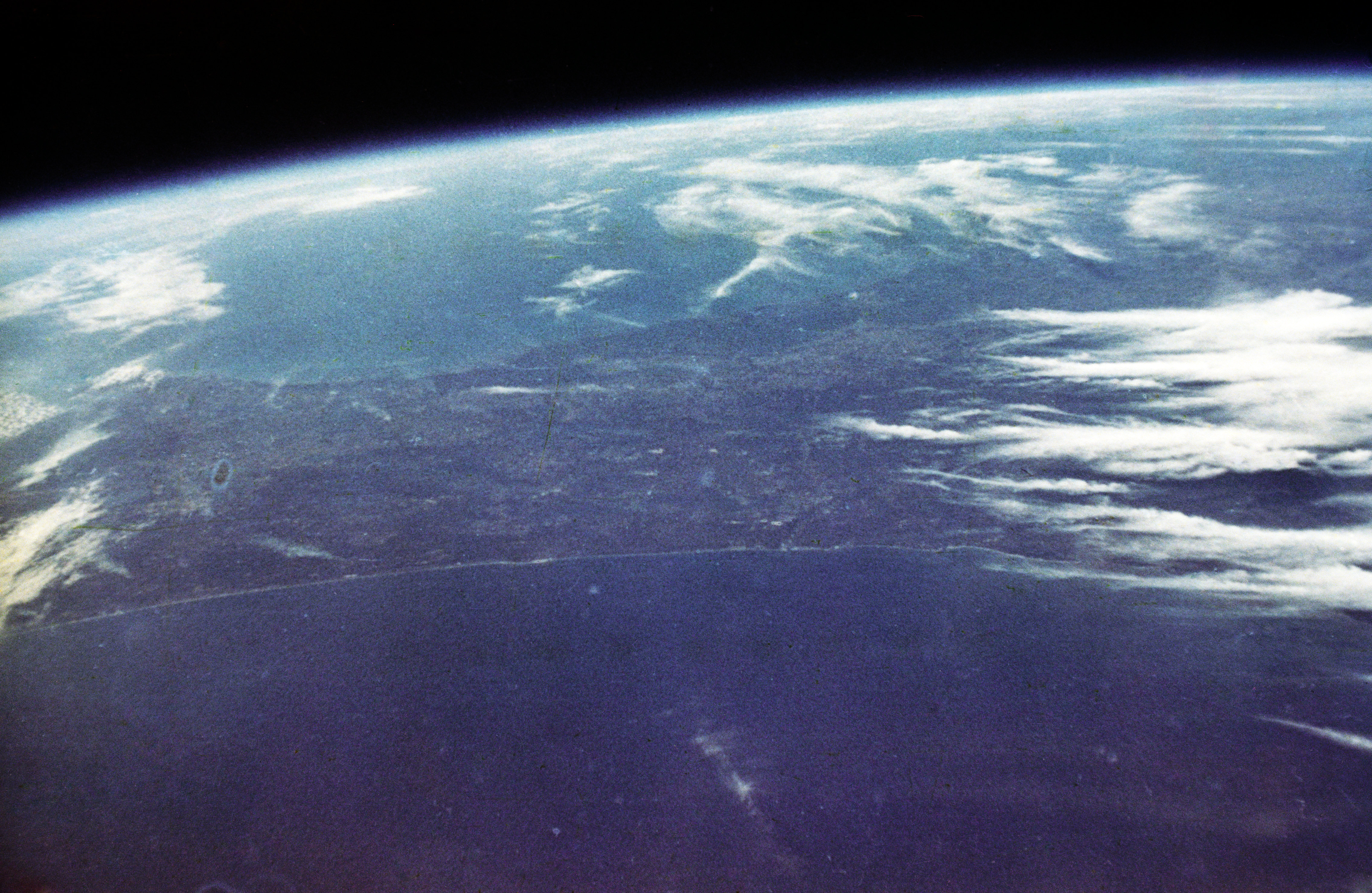
Photo taken by Glenn (with an Ansco Autoset, a rebadged Minolta Hi-Matic) during his flight

As the spacecraft crossed the Kauaʻi, Hawaii tracking station, Glenn noticed a lot of interference on the HF radio band. As he crossed the Pacific coast of North America, the tracking station at Guaymas, Mexico, informed Mercury Control in Florida that a yaw thruster was causing attitude control problems. Glenn later recalled, this problem "was to stick with me for the rest of the flight".

Glenn noticed the control problem when the automatic stabilization and control system allowed the spacecraft to drift about a degree and a half per second to the right. Glenn switched control to manual-proportional control mode and moved Friendship 7 back to the proper attitude. He tried different control modes to see which used the least fuel to maintain altitude. The manual fly-by-wire combination used the least fuel. After about twenty minutes, the yaw thruster began working again and Glenn switched back to the automatic control system. It worked for a short time and then began having problems again, this time with the opposite yaw thruster. He then switched back to the manual fly-by-wire system and flew the spacecraft in that mode for the remainder of the flight.

=== Second orbit ===
As Friendship 7 crossed Cape Canaveral at the start of its second orbit, flight systems controller Don Arabian noticed that "Segment 51", a sensor providing data on the spacecraft landing system, was giving a strange reading. According to the reading, the heat shield and landing bag were no longer locked in position. If this were the case, the heat shield was only being held against the spacecraft by the straps of the retro package. Mercury Control ordered all tracking sites to monitor "Segment 51" closely and advise Glenn that the landing-bag deploy switch should be in the "off" position.

Glenn was not immediately aware of the problem, but he became suspicious when site after site asked him to make sure that the landing-bag deploy switch was off. Meanwhile, Friendship 7 was crossing the Atlantic for the second time. Glenn was busy manually keeping the spacecraft attitude correct and also trying to accomplish as many of the flight plan tasks as he could.

Crossing over the Canary Islands, Glenn observed that the "fireflies" outside the spacecraft had no connection with gas from the reaction control jets. His suit temperature felt too warm, but he did not take time to adjust it. The Kano, Nigeria and Zanzibar sites suddenly noticed a 12 percent drop in the spacecraft secondary oxygen supply.

During his second pass over the Indian Ocean, Glenn found that the Indian Ocean tracking ship was in heavy weather. The tracking station had planned to release balloons for a pilot observation experiment, but instead the ship fired star-shell parachute flares as Friendship 7 passed overhead. Glenn was able to observe the flashes of lightning from storms in the area but was unable to see the flares.

The temperature in Glenn's spacesuit was too warm. It had been since he passed over the Canary Islands, earlier in the second orbit. As he crossed the Indian Ocean, he tried to adjust the suit temperature. As he approached Woomera, Australia, a signal light came on warning him of excess cabin humidity. For the rest of the flight, Glenn had to carefully balance suit cooling against the cabin humidity.

While he was still over Australia, another warning light came on, indicating that the fuel supply for the automatic control system was down to 62%. Mercury Control recommended that Glenn let the spacecraft attitude drift to conserve fuel.

There were no more problems for Friendship 7 during the remainder of the second orbit. Glenn continued to manually control the spacecraft attitude, not allowing it to drift too far out of alignment. In doing so, he consumed more fuel than a functioning automatic system would have used. Fuel consumption was 6 pounds (2.7 kg) from the automatic tank and 11.8 pounds (5.4 kg) from the manual tank during the second orbit. This amounted to almost 30% of the total fuel supply.

=== Third orbit ===
On the third orbit of Friendship 7, the Indian Ocean tracking ship did not attempt to launch any objects for pilot observation experiments, as the cloud coverage was still too thick. When the spacecraft came across Australia for the third time, Glenn joked with Cooper at the Muchea Tracking Station. Glenn asked Cooper to notify General Shoup, Commandant of the Marine Corps, that three orbits should meet the minimum monthly requirement of four hours' flying time. He also asked to be certified as eligible for his regular flight pay.

=== Reentry ===
During Glenn's orbits, Mercury Control had been monitoring the problem with "Segment 51". The Hawaiian tracking station asked Glenn to toggle the landing bag deploy switch into the automatic position. If a light came on, reentry should take place while retaining the retro pack. Given the earlier questions about the landing bag switch, Glenn realized the controllers must have found a possible problem with a loose heat shield. The test was run but no light appeared. Glenn also reported there were no bumping noises during spacecraft maneuvers.

Mercury Control was still undecided on the course of action to take. Some controllers thought the retrorocket pack should be jettisoned after retrofire, while other controllers thought the retro pack should be retained, as added assurance that the heat shield would stay in place. Mission Director Walter C. Williams decided to keep the retro pack in place during reentry, overruling Flight Director Chris Kraft. Walter Schirra, the California communicator at Point Arguello, relayed the instructions to Glenn: the retro pack should be retained until the spacecraft was over the Texas tracking station. After the mission was over, the "Segment 51" warning light problem was later determined to be a faulty sensor switch, meaning that the heat shield and landing bag were in fact secure during reentry.

Glenn was now preparing for reentry. Retaining the retro package meant he would have to retract the periscope manually. He would also have to activate the 0.05-g sequence by pushing the override switch. Friendship 7 neared the California coast. It had been four hours and 33 minutes since launch. The spacecraft was maneuvered into retrofire attitude and the first retrorocket fired. "Roger. Retros are firing. ... Are they ever. It feels like I'm going back toward Hawaii", Glenn radioed. The second and then the third retros fired at five-second intervals. The spacecraft attitude was steady during retrofire. Six minutes after retrofire, Glenn maneuvered the spacecraft into a 14-degree nose up pitch attitude for reentry.

Friendship 7 lost altitude in its reentry glide over the continental United States, and headed toward splashdown in the Atlantic. The Texas tracking station told Glenn to retain the retro pack until the accelerometer read 1.5 g (14.7 m/s^{2}). Glenn reported as he crossed Cape Canaveral that he had been controlling the spacecraft manually and would use the fly-by-wire mode as a backup. Mercury Control then gave him the 0.05 g (0.49 m/s^{2}) mark, and he pressed the override button. About the same time, Glenn heard noises that sounded like "small things brushing against the capsule". "This is Friendship 7 – a real fireball outside," he radioed Mercury Control. A strap from the retro package broke partially loose and hung over the spacecraft window as it was consumed in the reentry plasma stream. The spacecraft control system was working well but the manual fuel supply was down to 15 percent. The peak of reentry deceleration was still to come. Glenn switched to fly-by-wire and the automatic tank supply. This combination had more available fuel.

The spacecraft now experienced peak reentry heating. Glenn later reported, "I thought the retro pack had jettisoned and saw chunks coming off and flying by the window." He feared the chunks were pieces of his heat shield that might be disintegrating. The chunks were pieces of the retro package breaking up in the reentry fireball.

After passing the peak g region, Friendship 7 began oscillating severely. The astronaut could not control the ship manually. The spacecraft was oscillating past 10 degrees on both sides of the vertical zero-degree point. "I felt like a falling leaf," Glenn later said. He activated the auxiliary damping system, which helped to stabilize the large yaw and roll rates. Fuel in the automatic tanks was getting low. Glenn wondered if the spacecraft would retain stability until it was low enough to deploy the drogue parachute.

The automatic fuel supply ran out at 1 minute and 51 seconds, and manual fuel ran out at 51 seconds, before drogue chute deployment. The oscillations resumed. At 35,000 feet (11 km), Glenn decided to deploy the drogue chute manually to regain attitude stability. Just before he reached the switch, the drogue chute opened automatically at 28,000 feet (8.5 km) instead of the programmed 21,000 feet (6.4 km). The spacecraft regained stability and Glenn reported, "everything was in good shape."

At 17,000 feet (5.2 km) the periscope opened and was available for the astronaut to use. Glenn tried to look out the overhead window instead, but it was coated with so much smoke and film that he could see very little. The spacecraft continued to descend on the drogue chute. The antenna section jettisoned and the main chute deployed and opened to its full diameter. Mercury Control reminded Glenn to manually deploy the landing bag. He toggled the switch and the green light confirmation came on. A "clunk" could be heard as the heat shield and landing bag dropped into place, four feet (1.2 m) below the capsule.

=== Splashdown ===
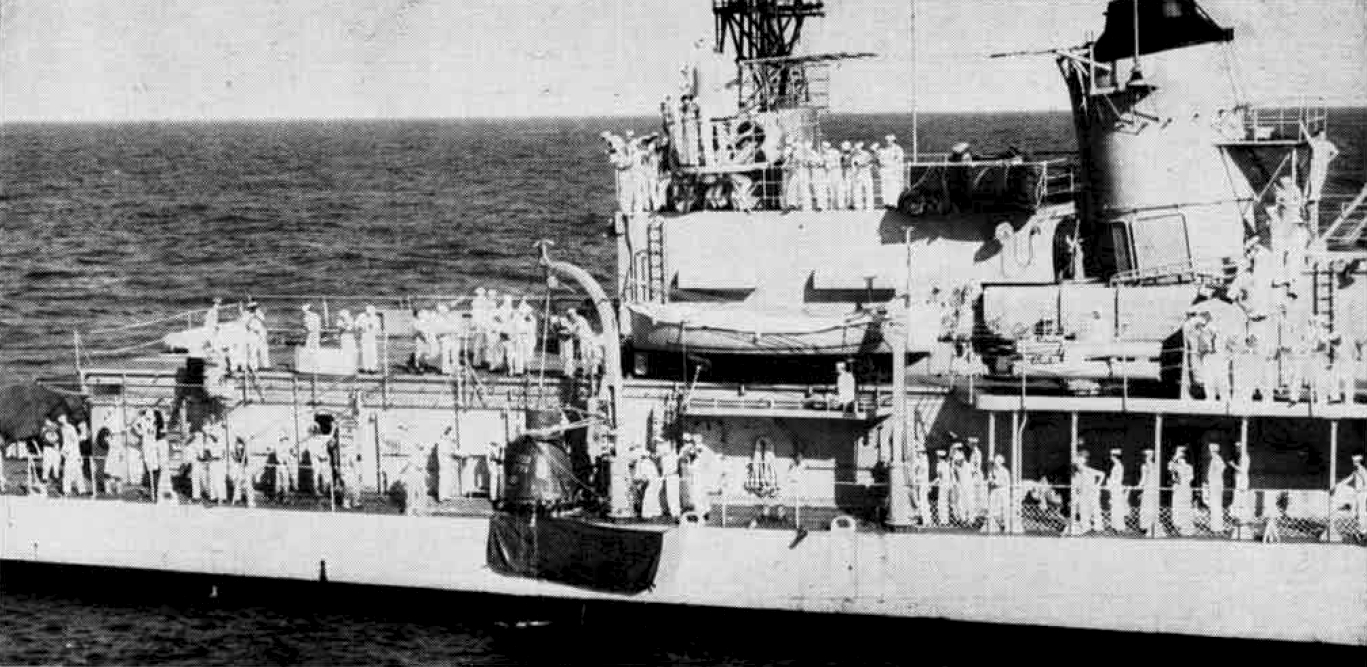
The destroyer Noa hoists the Friendship 7 capsule aboard

The spacecraft splashed down in the North Atlantic about 220 miles (350 km) northwest of Puerto Rico and near 21°20′N 68°40′W, 40 miles (64 km) short of the planned landing zone. Retrofire calculations had not taken into account spacecraft mass loss due to use of onboard consumables. USS Noa, a destroyer code-named "Steelhead", had spotted the spacecraft when it was descending on its parachute. The destroyer was about 6 miles (9.7 km) away when it radioed Glenn that it would reach him shortly. Noa came alongside Friendship 7 seventeen minutes later.

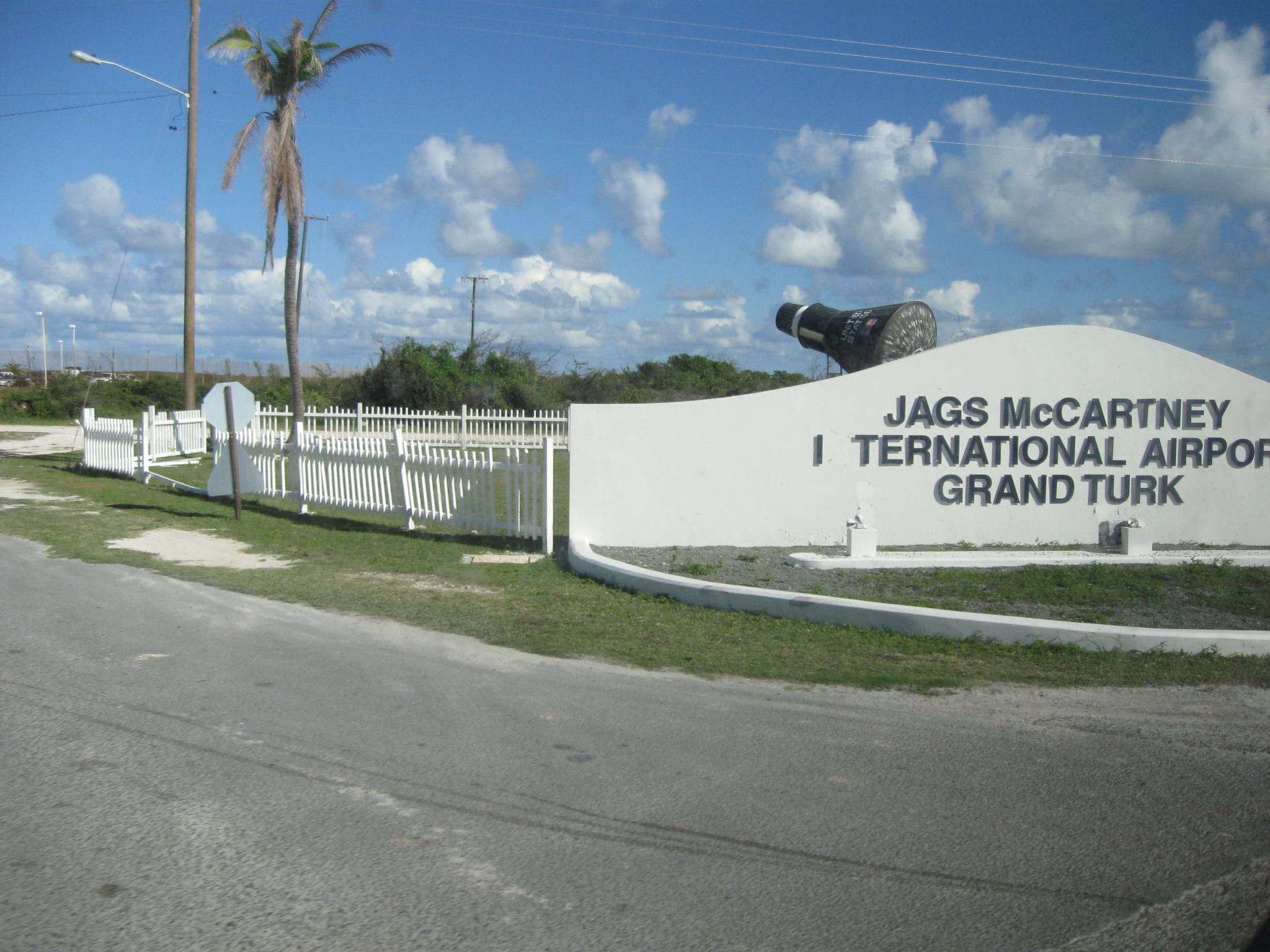
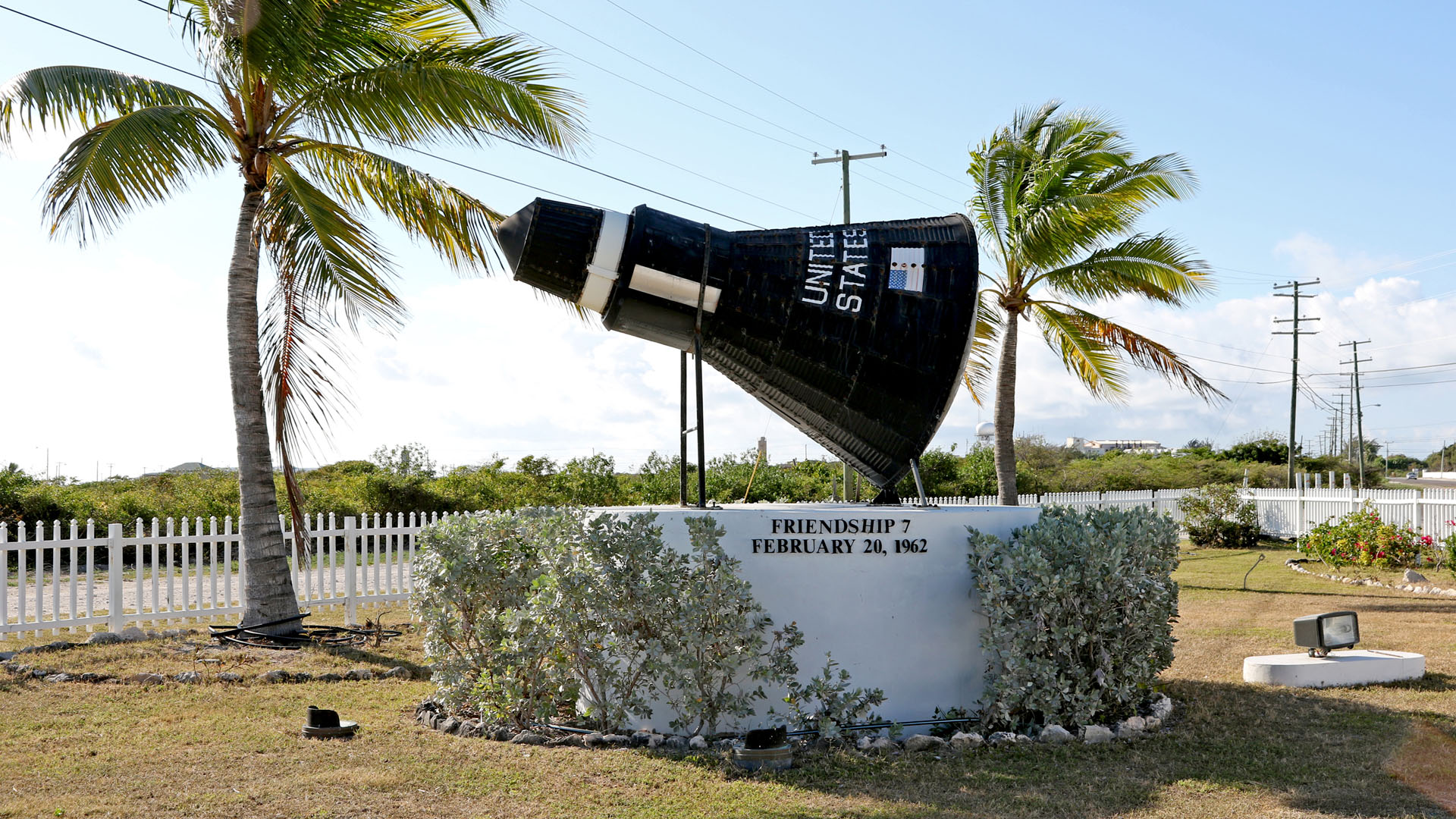
A replica of the Friendship 7 capsule at JAGS McCartney International Airport on Grand Turk, an island located near the splashdown location.

One crewman cleared the spacecraft antenna and another crewman attached a line to hoist Friendship 7 aboard. After being pulled from the water, the spacecraft bumped against the side of the destroyer. Once Friendship 7 was on deck, Glenn intended to leave the capsule through the upper hatch, but it was too hot in the spacecraft and Glenn decided to blow the side hatch instead. He told the ship's crew to stand clear and hit the hatch detonator plunger with the back of his hand. The detonator plunger recoiled, and slightly cut the astronaut's knuckles through his glove. With a loud bang, the hatch was off. Harry Beal, the first U.S. Navy Seal, pulled Glenn out of Friendship 7. A smiling Glenn got out of Friendship 7 and stood on the deck of Noa. His first words were, "It was hot in there."

The astronaut and spacecraft came through the mission in good shape.

== Publicity ==
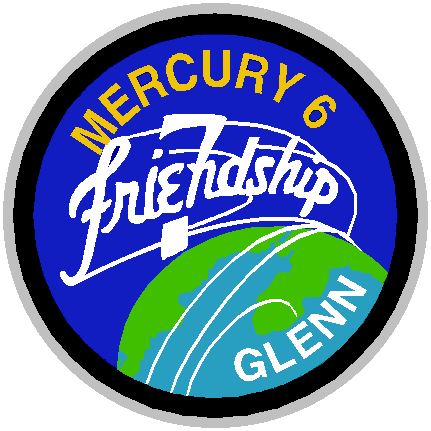
Mission insignia

=== Audience ===
CBS broadcast the flight with Walter Cronkite discussing it to an audience of "[m]ost Americans" and many Americans who did not watch on CBS saw the event on ABC or NBC.

=== "The Fourth Orbit" ===
After the return of Friendship 7, NASA announced on April 19, 1962, that the spacecraft would be lent to the United States Information Agency for a world tour. The tour included more than 20 stops, becoming known as the "Fourth orbit of Friendship 7".

== Spacecraft location ==
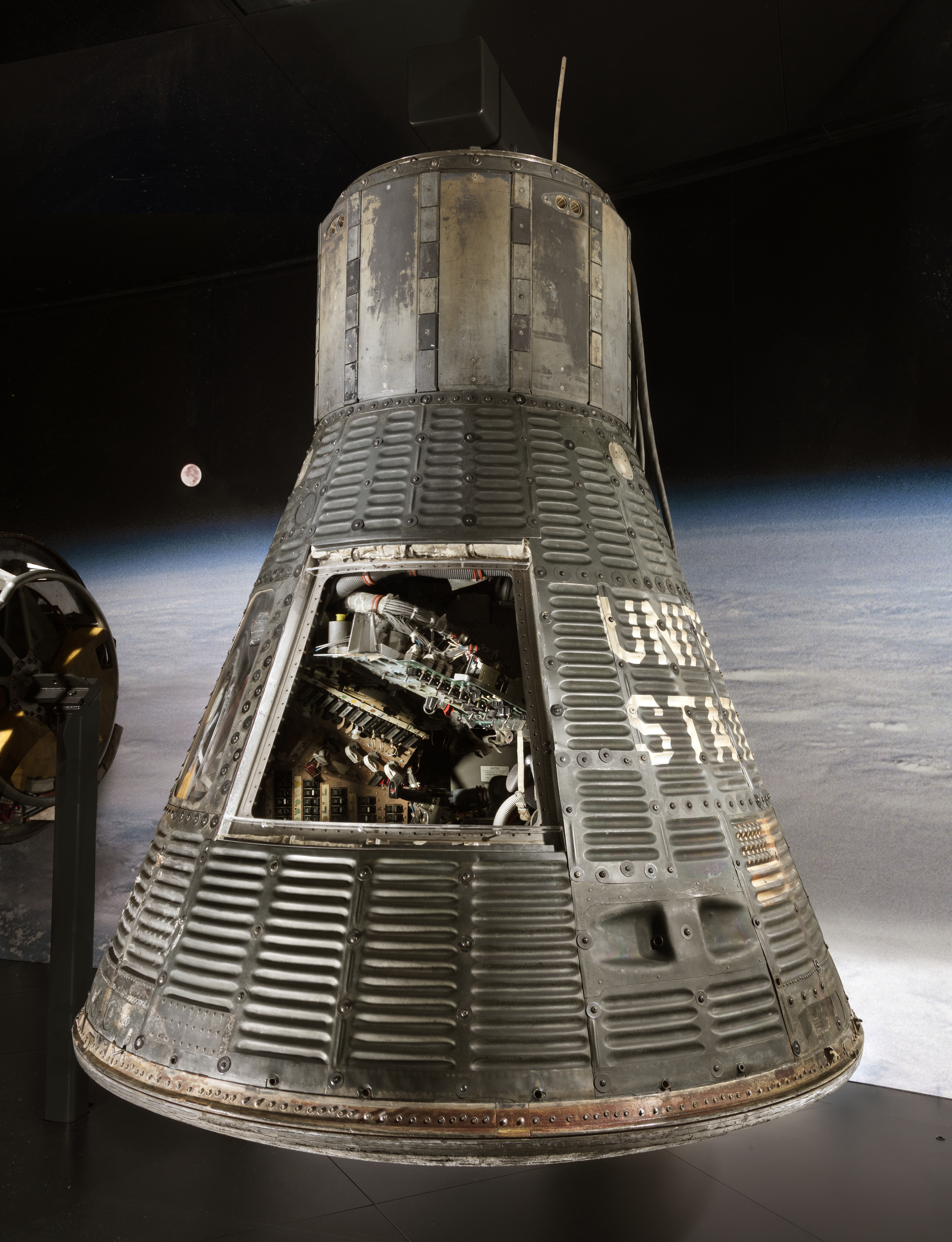
Friendship 7 on exhibit at the Steven F. Udvar-Hazy Center National Air and Space Museum in Chantilly, Virginia

Mercury spacecraft # 13 – Friendship 7 – is currently displayed at the Smithsonian Air and Space Museum at the National Mall, Washington, DC.

== Timeline and parameters ==
=== Launch ===
Attempt	Planned (UTC)	Result	Turnaround	Reason	Decision point	Notes
1	27 Jan 1962, 12:00:00 am	scrubbed		weather	T-minus 29 minutes	Weather conditions
2	30 Jan 1962, 12:00:00 am	scrubbed	3 days, 0 hours, 0 minutes	technical		Fuel tank leak in Atlas launch vehicle discovered during fueling
3	14 Feb 1962, 12:00:00 am	scrubbed	15 days, 0 hours, 0 minutes	weather		"Unfavorable weather conditions"
4	20 Feb 1962, 2:47:39 pm	success	6 days, 14 hours, 48 minutes			Countdown began at 2:45 am local time

=== Flight ===
Time (hh:mm:ss)	Event	Description
00:00:00	Liftoff	Mercury-Atlas lifts off, onboard clock starts.
00:00:02	Roll Program	Mercury-Atlas rotates along its axis 2.5 deg/s from 30 to 0 deg.
00:00:16	Pitch Program	Mercury-Atlas begins a 0.5 deg/s pitch from 90 to 0 deg.
00:00:30	Radio Guidance Lock	General Electric-Burroughs guidance system locks onto radio transponder in Atlas booster to guide the vehicle until orbit insertion.
00:01:24	Max Q	Maximum dynamic pressure 980 lbf/ft^{2} (47 kPa)
00:02:10	BECO	Atlas Booster Engine Cutoff. Booster engines drop away.
00:02:33	Tower Jettison	Escape Tower Jettison, no longer needed.
00:02:25	Atlas Pitchover	After tower separation, vehicle pitches over further.
00:05:20	SECO	Atlas Sustainer Engine Cutoff, capsule reaches orbit, velocity 17,547 mph (7,844 m/s)
00:05:24	Capsule Separation	Posigrade rockets fire for 1 s giving 15 ft/s (4.6 m/s) separation.
00:05:25	5 second Rate Damping	ASCS damps capsule rates for 5 seconds in preparation for turnaround maneuver.
00:05:25	Turnaround Maneuver	Capsule (ASCS) system rotates capsule 180 degrees, to heat shield forward attitude. Nose is pitched down 34 degrees to retro fire position.
00:05:30 - 04:30:00	Orbital Operations	Orbital operations and experiments for 3 orbits.
04:30:00	Retro Sequence Start	Retrofire in 30 s. (ASCS) checks for proper retro attitude -34 deg pitch, 0 deg yaw, 0 deg roll.
04:30:30	Retrofire	Three retro rockets fire for 10 seconds each. They are started at 5 second intervals, firing overlaps for a total of 20 s. Delta V of 550 ft/s (170 m/s) is taken off forward velocity.
04:35:45	Retract Periscope	Periscope is retracted in preparation for reentry.
04:36:15	Retro Pack Jettison	One minute after retrofire retro pack is jettisoned, leaving heat shield clear. (Was overridden in the mission.)
04:36:20	Retro Attitude Maneuver	(ASCS) orients capsule in 34 degrees nose down pitch, 0 degrees roll, 0 degrees yaw.
04:42:15	.05 G Maneuver	(ASCS) detects beginning of reentry and rolls capsule at 10 deg/s to stabilize capsule during reentry.
04:49:38	Drogue Parachute Deploy	Drogue parachute deployed at 22,000 ft (6.7 km) slowing descent to 365 ft/s (111 m/s) and stabilizing capsule.
04:49:45	Snorkel Deploy	Fresh air snorkel deploys at 20,000 ft (6.1 km) ECS switches to emergency oxygen rate to cool cabin.
04:50:15	Main Parachute Deploy	Main parachute deploys at 10,000 ft (3.0 km). Descent rate slows to 30 ft/s (9.1 m/s)
04:50:20	Landing Bag Deploy	Landing bag deploys, dropping heat shield down 4 ft (1.2 m).
04:50:20	Fuel Dump	Remaining hydrogen peroxide fuel automatically dumped.
04:55:30	Splashdown	Capsule lands in water about 500 mi (800 km) downrange from launch site.
04:55:30	Rescue Aids Deploy	Rescue aid package deployed. The package includes green dye marker, recovery radio beacon and whip antenna.

=== Parameters ===
- Mass of spacecraft: 2,981 pounds (1,352 kg)
- Perigee of orbit: 80 nautical miles (150 km)
- Apogee of orbit: 134 nautical miles (248 km)
- Inclination of orbit: 32.5°
- Orbital period: 88.5 min

NASA documentary with Glenn about Friendship 7, 2012

== Dramatization in film ==
Philip Kaufman's 1983 film The Right Stuff includes a dramatization of the Friendship 7 mission in which Ed Harris plays Glenn. The sequence depicts the spacecraft's three orbits and Glenn's responses to what he saw, sometimes quoted verbatim, as well as the concerns over the heat shield during reentry. The mysterious "fireflies" are also shown, but their true explanation is not revealed; instead they are depicted as magical protection summoned by Aboriginal Australians at the Muchea Tracking Station.

The 2016 film Hidden Figures features the Friendship 7 mission in the climax of the movie, focusing on Katherine Johnson's calculations of the landing.

== Anniversary commemoration ==
To commemorate the 50th anniversary of the flight in 2012, Glenn was surprised with the opportunity to speak with the orbiting crew of the International Space Station while Glenn was on-stage with NASA Administrator Charlie Bolden at Ohio State University, where the public affairs school is named in honor of Glenn.

== See also ==
- Devil's Cigarette Lighter, a gas well fire reportedly seen from orbit by Glenn
- Space capsule
- Space exploration
- Splashdown
- U.S. space exploration history on U.S. stamps
