= Second National Bank =

Second National Bank may refer to:

- Old Second National Bank, in Aurora, Illinois
- Second Bank of the United States, in Philadelphia, Pennsylvania
- Second National Bank (Washington, D.C.)
- Second National Bank of Meyersdale, in Somerset County, Pennsylvania
