= New Colonial Hotel =

- U.S. National Register of Historic Places
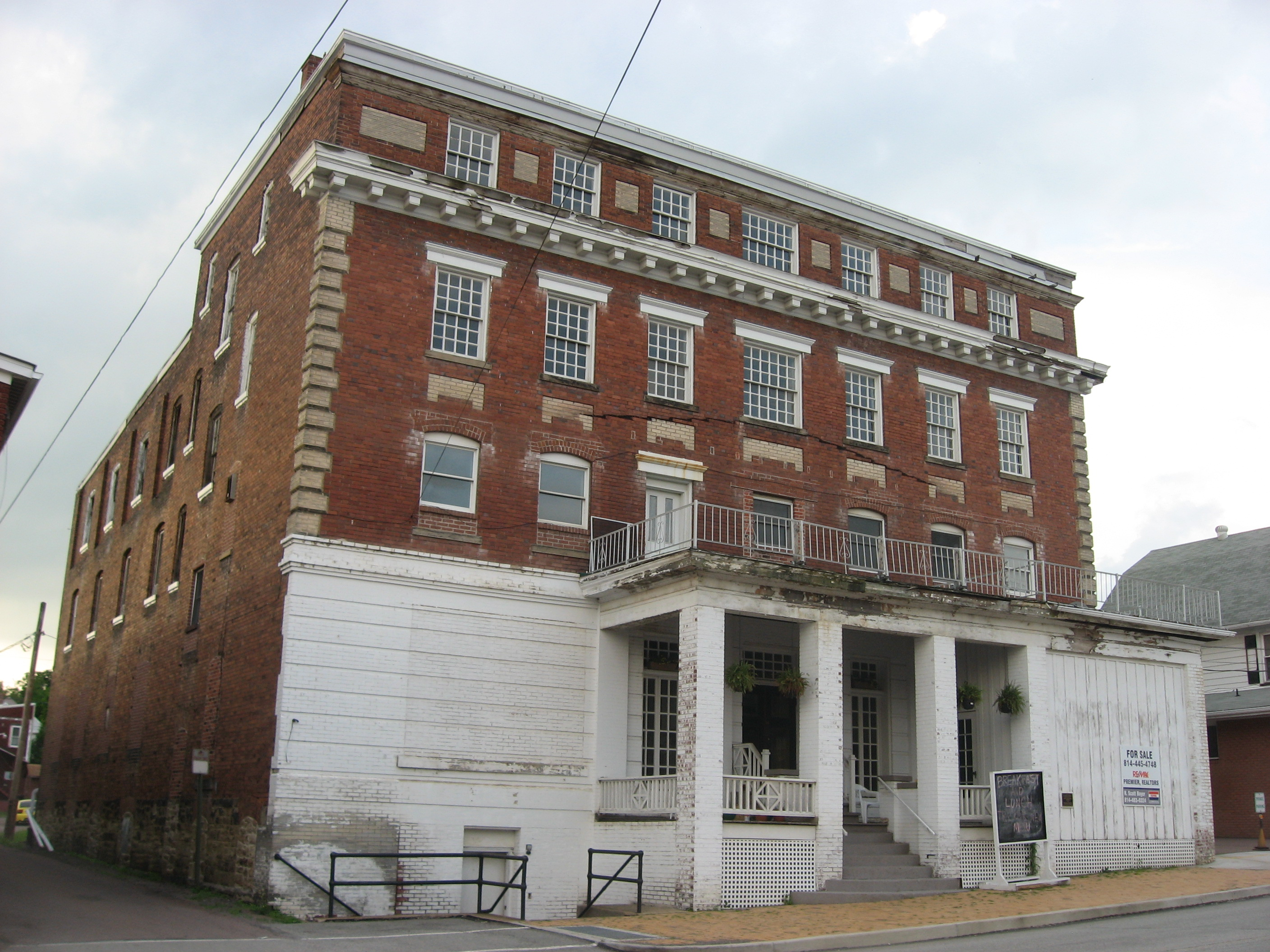
- Front and western side

- Location within Pennsylvania Location within the United States
- Location: 319 Main St., Meyersdale, Pennsylvania
- Coordinates: 39°49′1″N 79°1′30″W
- Area: less than one acre
- Built: 1903, 1948
- Architect: Meyersdale Planing Mill
- Architectural style: Colonial Revival
- NRHP reference No.: 05000411
- Added to NRHP: May 10, 2005

The New Colonial Hotel, also known as the Stagecoach Inn and Sechler Sport Distributing, was an historic hotel located in Meyersdale, Somerset County, Pennsylvania, United States.

It was added to the National Register of Historic Places in 2005. It was demolished in September 2020.

== History and architectural features ==
Built in 1904, this historic structure is a four-story brick building that sits on a sandstone foundation. It measures sixty-four feet wide by seventy feet deep, has a U-shaped plan, and was designed in the Colonial Revival style. The architect is believed to be Charles E. Cassell. It features a broad front porch, balcony, and dropped cornice between the third and fourth floors, and was home to the Pennsylvania Maple Festival starting in 1948.
