= USS Kephart =

Buckley-class destroyer escort

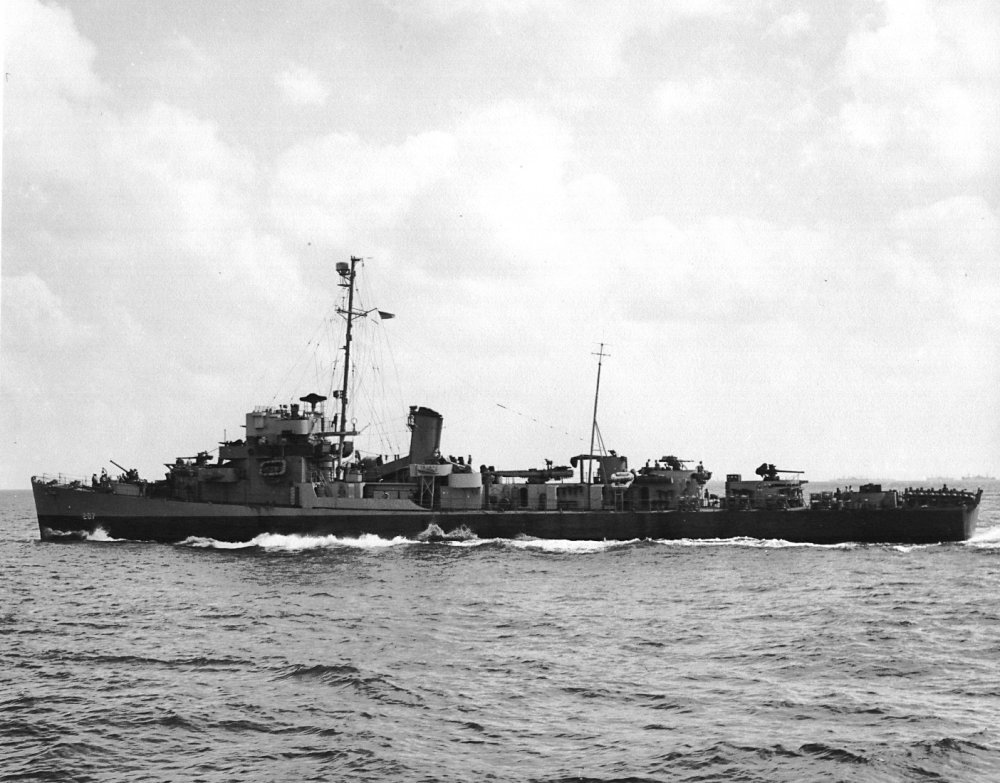

History

United States
- Name: USS Kephart
- Namesake: William P. Kephart
- Ordered: 1942
- Builder: Charleston Navy Yard
- Launched: 6 September 1943
- Commissioned: 7 January 1944
- Decommissioned: 21 June 1946
- Stricken: 1 May 1967
- Fate: Transferred to South Korea, 16 May 1967

South Korea
- Name: Gyeongbuk
- Acquired: 16 May 1967
- Commissioned: 1967
- Stricken: 30 April 1985

General characteristics
- Class & type: Buckley-class destroyer escort
- Displacement: 1,400 long tons (1,400 t)
- Length: 306 ft (93 m)
- Beam: 36 ft 10 in (11.23 m)
- Draft: 9 ft 5 in (2.87 m)
- Propulsion: 2 boilers, General Electric Turbo-electric drive; 2 solid manganese-bronze; 3,600 lb (1,600 kg) 3-bladed propellers, 8 ft 6 in (2.59 m) diameter, 7 ft 7 in (2.31 m) pitch; 12,000 hp (8.9 MW); 2 rudders
- Speed: 24 knots (44 km/h)
- Complement: 186 officers and enlisted
- Armament: 3 × 3"/50 guns (3×1); 4 × 1.1" guns (1×4); 8 × 20 mm guns (8×1); 3 × 21-inch (533 mm) torpedo tubes (1×3); 8 depth charge projectors (8×1); 1 Hedgehog depth charge projector; 2 depth charge tracks

USS Kephart (DE-207/APD-61) was a Buckley-class destroyer escort in service with the United States Navy from 1944 to 1947. After spending 20 years in reserve, she was transferred to Republic of Korea Navy and served another 18 years as Kyong Puk (PF-82) until she was struck in 1985.

== Namesake ==
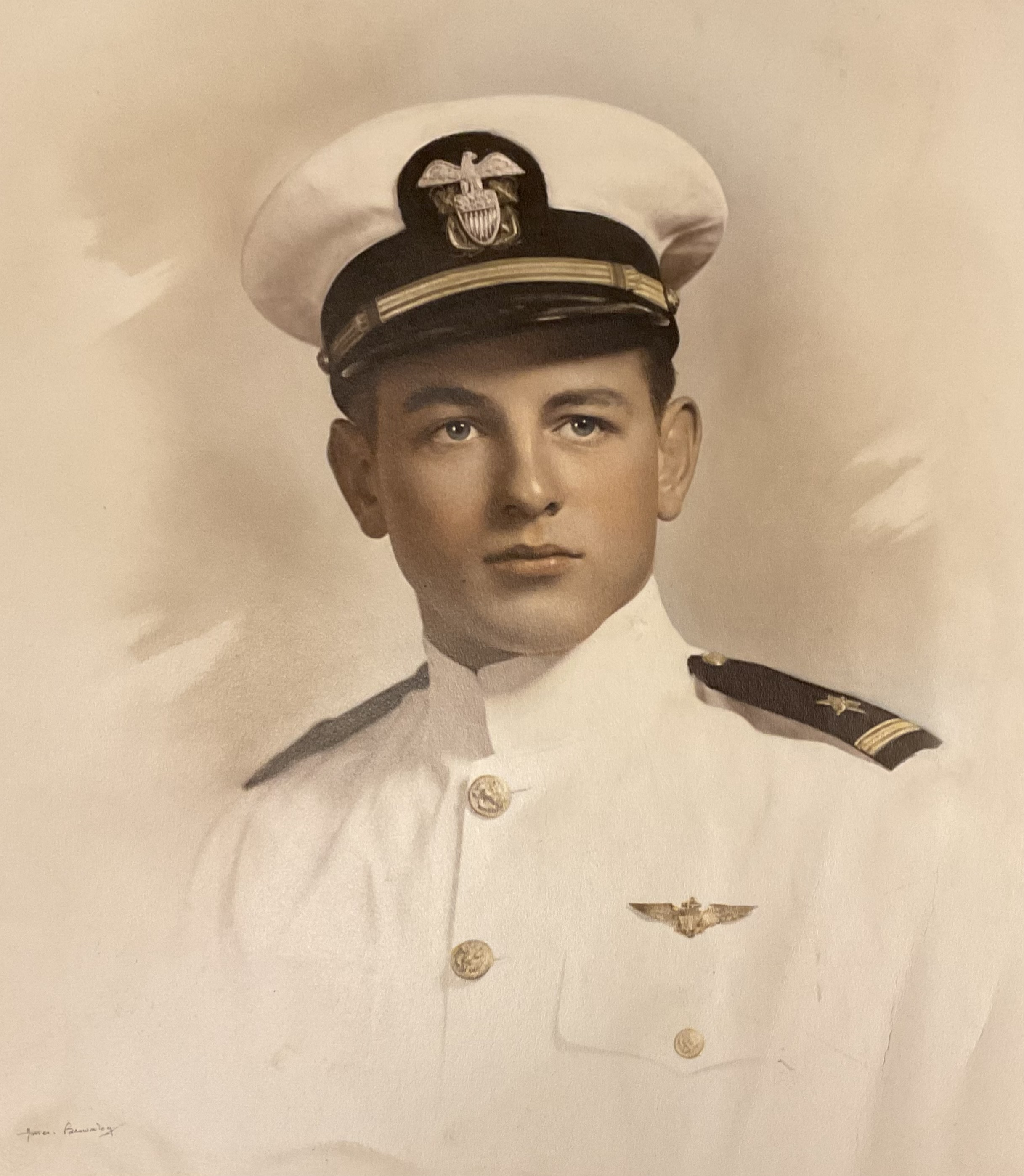
Ensign William P. Kephart

William Perry Kephart was born on 9 September 1915 in Meyersdale, Pennsylvania. He enlisted in the United States Naval Reserve on 15 August 1937 and was appointed Aviation Cadet 3 months later. After flight training at Naval Air Station Pensacola, Florida. He was commissioned Ensign on 1 December 1938.

Kephart served with air groups on the USS Saratoga and USS Wasp, and in May 1940 returned to Pensacola as a flight instructor. Six months later he rejoined Scouting Squadron 71 (VS-71) on board Wasp. Promoted to Lieutenant (j.g.) 15 June 1942 and Lieutenant (temporary) 1 October.

His squadron was performing a scouting mission on 15 September when the Wasp was hit. Finding it ablaze upon returning, he and the remainder of his squadron landed on the USS Hornet. Kephart and six other pilots were sent to Guadalcanal on 4 October. In the early morning of 14 October, the dugout he was sheltering in received a direct hit during a heavy Japanese naval bombardment and he lost his life along with his Squadron Commander, Executive Officer, and a recently arrived Flight Officer of a Marine squadron.

== History ==
Kephart was launched on 6 September 1943 at the Charleston Navy Yard, sponsored by Mrs. A. P. Kephart, Lt. Kephart's mother, and commissioned on 7 January 1944.

=== Battle of the Atlantic ===
After shakedown off Bermuda, Kephart departed New York on 23 March for convoy escort duty in the Atlantic. During the next three months, she made three runs from New York to Gibraltar and Bizerte, Tunisia. Returning to New York on 30 June for conversion to a Charles Lawrence-class high speed transport, she was reclassified APD-61 on 5 July.

=== Pacific War ===
Kephart departed New York on 30 September and joined the 7th Fleet at Hollandia, New Guinea, on 10 November. As a unit of TransDiv 103, she departed in convoy on 17 November and arrived at Leyte Gulf, Philippines, on 24 November. After a run to the Palaus, she embarked troops of the 77th Infantry Division at Leyte, and steamed on 6 December with Task Group 78.3 for amphibious assault at Ormoc Bay. During landing operations on 7 December, Kephart's guns splashed two Japanese planes in a fierce raid. Returning to Leyte on 8 December, she embarked soldiers of the 19th Infantry Regiment; she sailed on 12 December for Mindoro, and landed assault troops at San Jose on 15 December, again under heavy enemy air attack. Returning to Leyte on 17 December, she continued on 20 December to Hollandia to prepare for anti-submarine and amphibious operations.

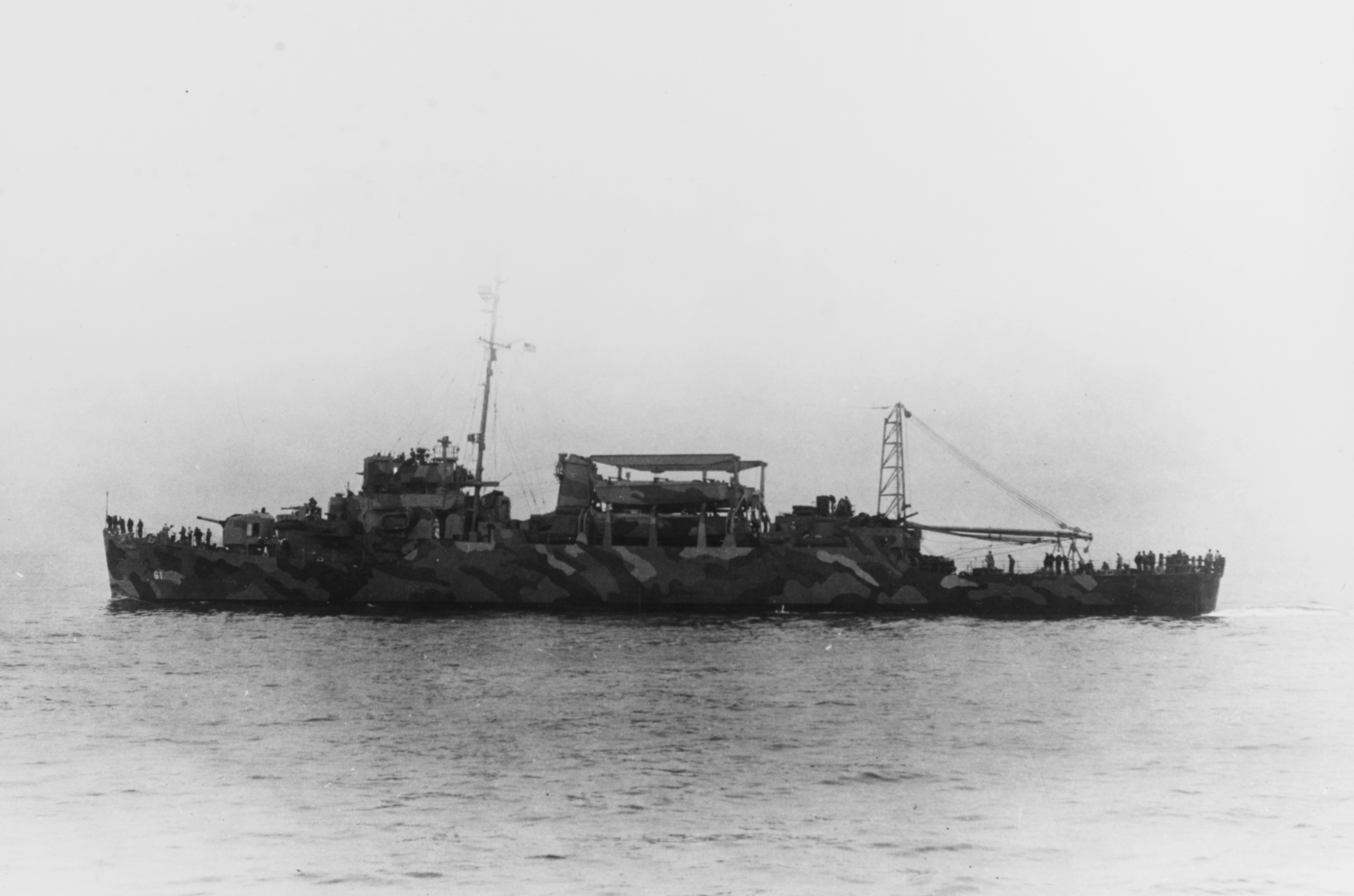
Kephart after her conversion to a high-speed transport.

Carrying men of the 158th Regimental Combat Team, Kephart departed Noemfoor, Schouten Islands, on 4 January 1945 to rejoin the fight to liberate the Philippines. Steaming to Luzon, she arrived at San Fabien, Lingayen Gulf, on 11 January, and landed reinforcements, despite constant harassment from enemy planes emerging from the heavy air attack unscathed. Returning to Leyte on 15 January for three months of anti-submarine patrol, Kephart took part in scattered landing operations in the Philippines: at Grande Island, Subic Bay (30 January); Puerto Princesa, Palawan (28 February); Zamboanga, Mindanao (10 March); Cebu City, Cebu (26 March); and Cotabato, Mindanao (17 April).

Kephart departed Leyte Gulf on 4 May for escort and assault operations in the Dutch East Indies, arriving Morotai on 7 May. After escorting a convoy to Mindanao (18–20 May), she returned to Morotai on 21 May and embarked troops of the Australian Army for an amphibious assault at Brunei Bay, North Borneo. Sailing on 4 June, she landed troops on 10 June amid dwindling enemy resistance; then she patrolled the South China Sea, hunting submarines before returning Morotai on 19 June. She sailed on 26 June carrying Australian soldiers to the eastern coast of Borneo, arriving on 1 July for the final major amphibious operation of the war – the landing operations at Balikpapan, Borneo.

Continuing escort and anti-submarine duty, Kephart departed Morotai on 16 July and reached Leyte Gulf two days later. On 4 August she began amphibious training at Albay and Lagonoy Gulfs, Luzon, in preparation for a possible invasion of Japan. After the fighting ended on 15 August, she sailed from Leyte Gulf on 29 August to Okinawa to embark occupation troops for Korea. She reached Jinsen, Korea, on 8 September; and then shuttled between the Philippines and Korea. She steamed from Jinsen on 29 October via Sasebo, Japan, and Okinawa to Tsingtao, China, arriving there on 14 November to support the Chinese Nationalists' effort to repel Communist aggression in mainland China.

=== Reserve Fleet ===
Returning to Okinawa on 22 November, Kephart embarked 147 homebound veterans and departed on 26 November for the United States. Steaming via Pearl Harbor, she reached San Diego, California on 16 December. Two days after unloading her passengers, she sailed for the East Coast, and arrived at New York on New Year's Day 1946. Following overhaul, she departed on 8 February for Green Cove Springs, Florida, arriving there on 11 February. Kephart was decommissioned on 21 June, and entered the Atlantic Reserve Fleet at Orange, Texas. She was struck from the Navy List on 1 May 1967 and transferred under the Military Assistance Program to the Republic of Korea on 16 May 1967.

Kephart received five battle stars for World War II service.

=== Transfer to South Korea ===
Kephart was renamed Kyong Puk (PF-82) by the Republic of Korea Navy. She was redesignated APD-85 in 1972, renumbered APD-826 in 1980, redesignated DE-826 in 1982. Kyong Puk was purchased outright by the Republic of Korea on 15 November 1974.

Kyong Puk was struck on 30 April 1985.
