= Harry Beal =

American Navy SEAL (1930–2021)

Harry Beal (August 16, 1930 – January 26, 2021) was the first US Navy Seal.

== Navy SEAL ==
Beal joined the U.S. Navy in 1948, first serving aboard the USS Shenandoah (AD-26) as a gunner's mate. He joined the underwater demolition team, the precursor to the Navy SEALs, in 1955. When the first Navy SEALs team was established in 1962, Beal was the first to volunteer for the elite special operations force. Later, Beal was credited with pulling John Glenn out of the water after his historic spaceflight. Beal became a SEAL instructor, serving until his retirement from the U.S. Navy in 1968.

== Later career ==
Beal later worked for the Pennsylvania Department of Transportation for 20 years until his retirement in 1990. In 2020, a bridge was named after Beal in his hometown of Meyersdale, Pennsylvania. He died on January 26, 2021.
