= Meyersdale Area High School =

Coordinates: 39.79739°N 79.04476°W

Location
- 1349 Shaw Mines Road; Summit Township, Somerset County, Pennsylvania; Meyersdale, Pennsylvania 15552

Information
- School type: Public High School
- School district: Meyersdale Area School District
- NCES District ID: 4215150
- Superintendent: Tracey Karlie
- NCES School ID: 421515003994
- Principal: John Wiltrout
- Faculty: 22 (FTE)
- Grades: 9-12
- Enrollment: 282 (2017-18)
- Student to teacher ratio: 12.82
- Colors: Red, White and Black
- Athletics conference: PIAA District V / WestPac South
- Mascot: Red Raiders
- Newspaper: Raider Review
- Yearbook: Hi-Point
- Communities served: Meyersdale
- Feeder schools: Meyersdale Area Middle School
- Website: Meyersdale Area High School

Meyersdale Area High School is a four-year high school, located just south of Meyersdale in southcentral Somerset County in Summit Township.Curriculum

Students in grades 10-12 who wish to pursue training in a specific career path or field may attend the Somerset County Technology Center in Somerset Township.

== Athletics ==
Meyersdale Area participates in PIAA District V

Sport	Boys	Girls
Baseball	Class AA	
Basketball	Class A	Class A
Cross Country	Class AA	Class AA
Football	Class AA	
Rifle	Class AAAA	Class AAAA
Soccer	Class AA	Class AA
Softball		Class A
Track / Field	Class AA	Class AA
Volleyball		Class A
Wrestling	Class AA	
