= Meyersdale Area School District =

School district in Pennsylvania

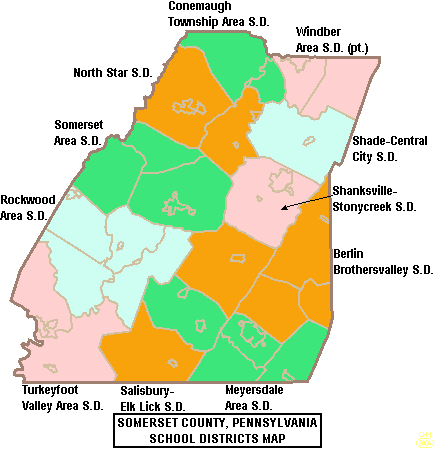

Address
- 1349 Shaw Mines Road Meyersdale, Pennsylvania, 15552; United States

District information
- Type: Public
- Grades: K-12

Students and staff
- Colors: Red, black, white

Other information
- Website: www.masd.net

The Meyersdale Area School District is a public school district located in Somerset County, Pennsylvania. It serves the boroughs of Meyersdale, Garrett, Larimer, Callimont, and Wellersburg, plus the townships of Summit, Larimer, Greenville, and Southampton. It features one elementary, one middle, and one high school. It encompasses approximately 121 square miles. According to 2000 federal census data, it serves a resident population of 7,480.

== History ==
The Meyersdale Area School District has a rich history, dating back to the latter part of the 19th century. The Jr./High School was built on its current site off of US Route 219 in Summit Township, Somerset County, PA in the late 1950s. At the beginning of the 1973–74 school year, the current grade school was opened, adjoining the current Secondary Campus. The Administration moved into the current S.J. Miller school building, near the school campus. The following year, High School Students had the opportunity to attend the Somerset County Vocational-Technical School in Somerset Township.

== School Information ==
School	Grade Level
Meyersdale Area High School	Grades 9–12
Meyersdale Area Middle School	Grades 6–8
Meyersdale Area Elementary School	Grades K-5
