= Minolta Hi-Matic =

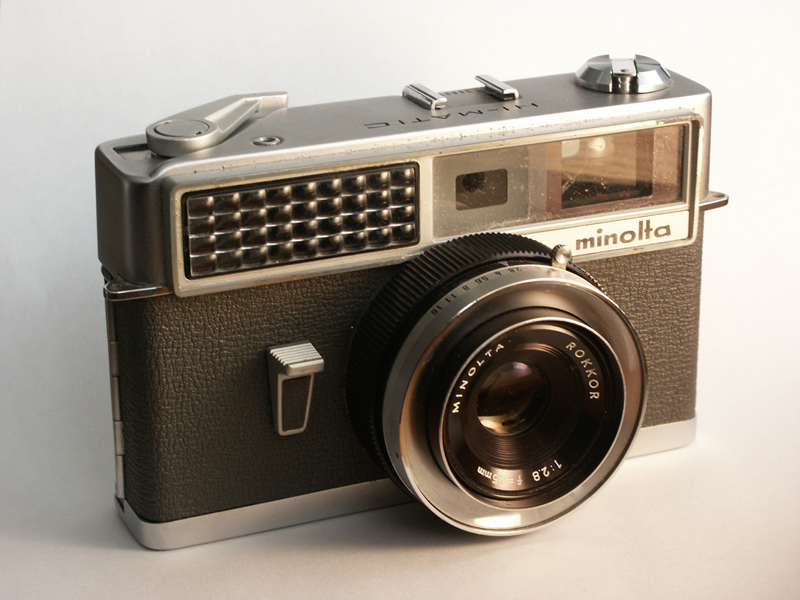
- The original Hi-Matic of 1962

Overview
- Maker: Minolta
- Type: 35mm rangefinder camera
- Released: 1962

Lens
- Lens mount: fixed lens

Sensor/medium
- Film format: 35mm
- Film size: 36 mm x 24 mm

Focusing
- Focus: Manual focus, coupled rangefinder

Exposure/metering
- Exposure: Shutter priority, manual override

General
- Made in: Japan

Hi-Matic was the name of a long-running series of 35 mm cameras made by Minolta. The original Hi-Matic of 1962 was the first Minolta camera to feature automatic exposure and achieved a small degree of fame when a version (the Ansco Autoset) was taken into space by John Glenn in 1962.

== Models ==
The first Hi-Matic, introduced in 1962, was offered with a 45 mm f/2 or 45 mm f/2.8 lens and featured a built-in selenium light meter and rangefinder. Both the aperture and shutter speed were set automatically. The Hi-Matic was also rebadged as the Ansco Autoset.

The Hi-Matic 7 followed in 1963. It had a faster f/1.8 lens and used a CdS cell instead of a selenium meter. Additionally, it gave photographers the option of setting the exposure manually, an option not available in the original Hi-Matic. The Hi-Matic 7S and Hi-Matic 9, both released in 1966, were somewhat improved versions of the popular 7. Compared with the 7, the 7S had the Contrast Light Compensator (CLC) metering system. The CLC had two CdS cells connected in series that purportedly offered superior metering, especially in high contrast lighting. Also, the 7S had a hot shoe instead of the cold shoe of the 7. The 9 was the same as the 7S with the addition of a slightly faster f/1.7 lens, additional shutter speeds of 1/2 and 1 sec., and Minolta's "Easy-Flash" system, which simplified flash photography. The Hi-Matic 11 of 1969 was similar to the 9, but the 11 had shutter priority automatic exposure, aperture and shutter speed displayed in the viewfinder, and no aperture ring.

In 1969 Minolta came out with a new, smaller model, the Hi-Matic C. In the interest of compactness, it had a smaller 40 mm f/2.7 lens (which was collapsible), reduced aperture and shutter speed ranges, and no longer featured a rangefinder. The C had shutter-priority automatic exposure with a CdS meter. The Hi-Matic 5, also released in 1969, was basically a less expensive C without the collapsing lens.

The Hi-Matic E of 1971 was a much-improved version of the C with a 40 mm f/1.7 lens and a rangefinder. It used the same Electro Control automatic exposure system found on the Yashica Electro cameras. The E was followed by a succession of increasingly inexpensive models, the Hi-Matic F in 1972, the Hi-Matic G (dropped the rangefinder) in 1974, and the Hi-Matic G2 in 1982. The Electro Control system was abandoned after the F in favor of a simpler system.

The next Hi-Matic model, which was called the Hi-Matic 7 SII and came out in 1977, was considered to be one of the finest Minolta rangefinders. It featured a 40 mm f/1.7 lens and shutter priority automatic exposure in addition to manual controls, all in a compact package.

A built in electronic flash came to the series for the first time in 1978 with the Hi-Matic S. It was a fully automatic (except for focusing) camera equipped with a Rokkor 38 mm f/2.7 lens. There were several variants, including the Hi-Matic SD (date back), the Hi-Matic S2 (slightly slower lens), and the Hi-Matic SD2 (S2 with a date back). Focusing was automated in 1979 with the introduction of the Hi-Matic AF, which was essentially an S2 with the addition of autofocus.

The last Hi-Matic was the Hi-Matic GF of 1984, a very simple and cheap plastic model which was not sold in the United States. It had a 38mm f/4 lens that allowed to choose between three predefined apertures denoted by beginner friendly icons: sunny, partly cloudy and cloudy. Focusing was manual and set in four steps from about 1 m to infinite.

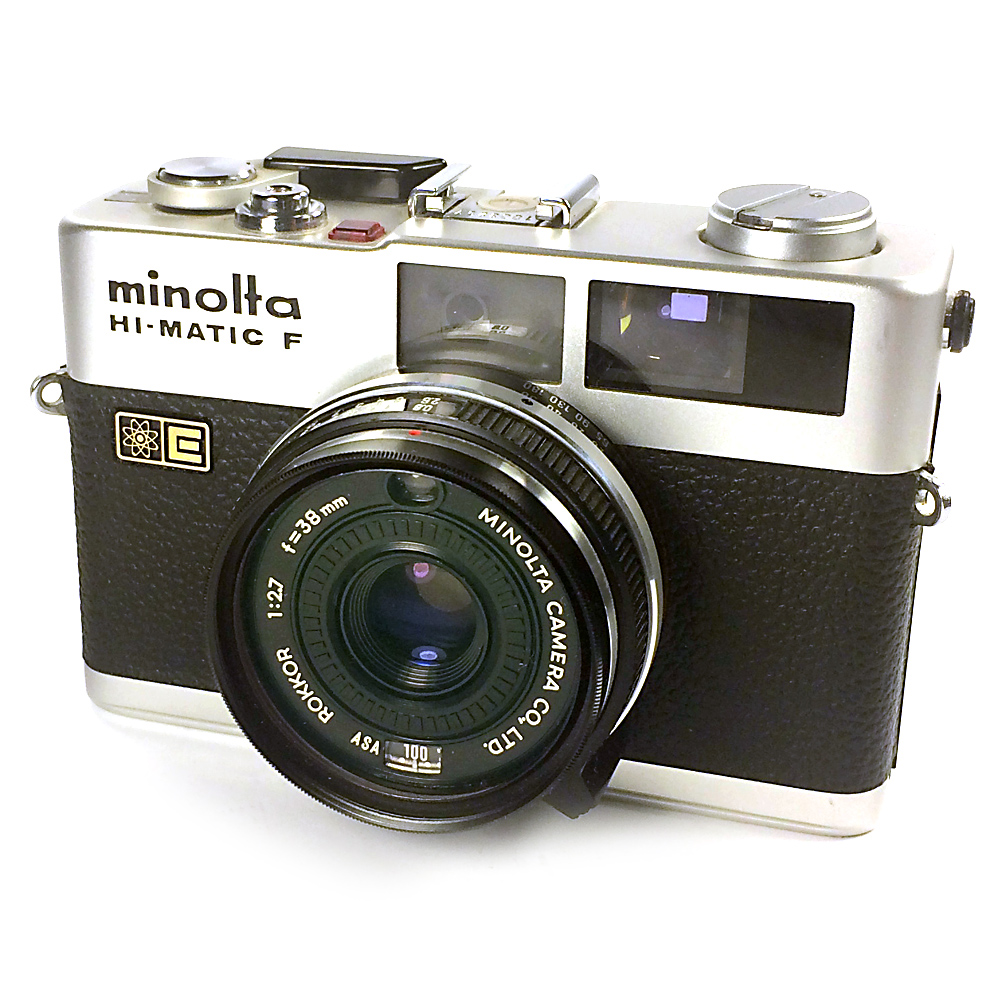
Minolta Hi-Matic F rangefinder camera made in Japan, 1972

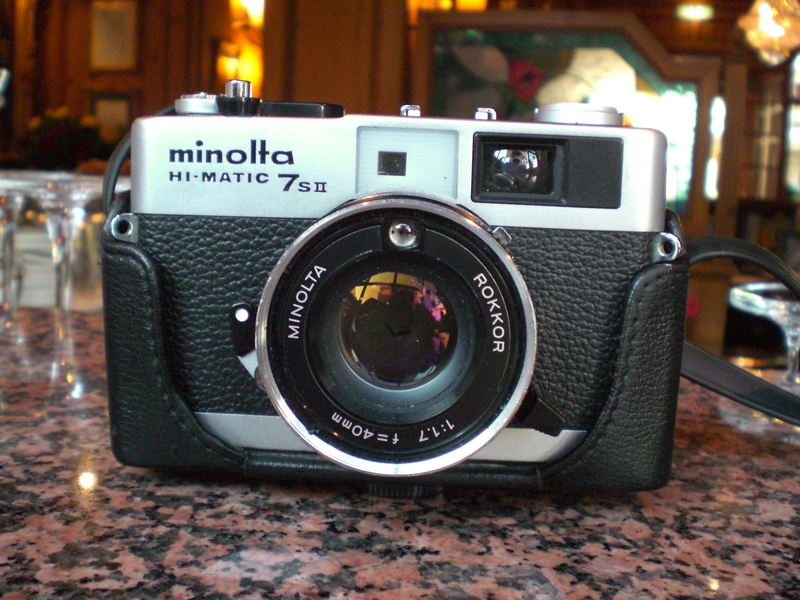
The Hi-Matic 7 SII of 1977

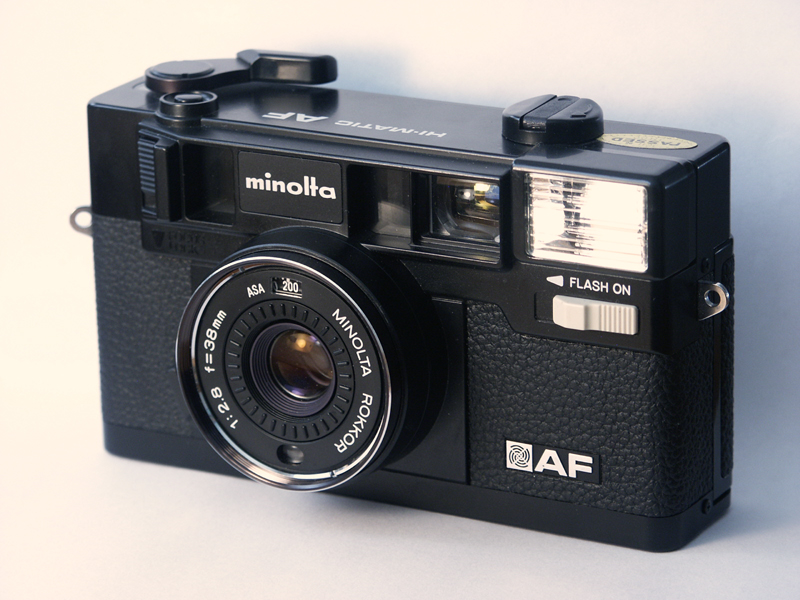
Hi-Matic AF, 1979

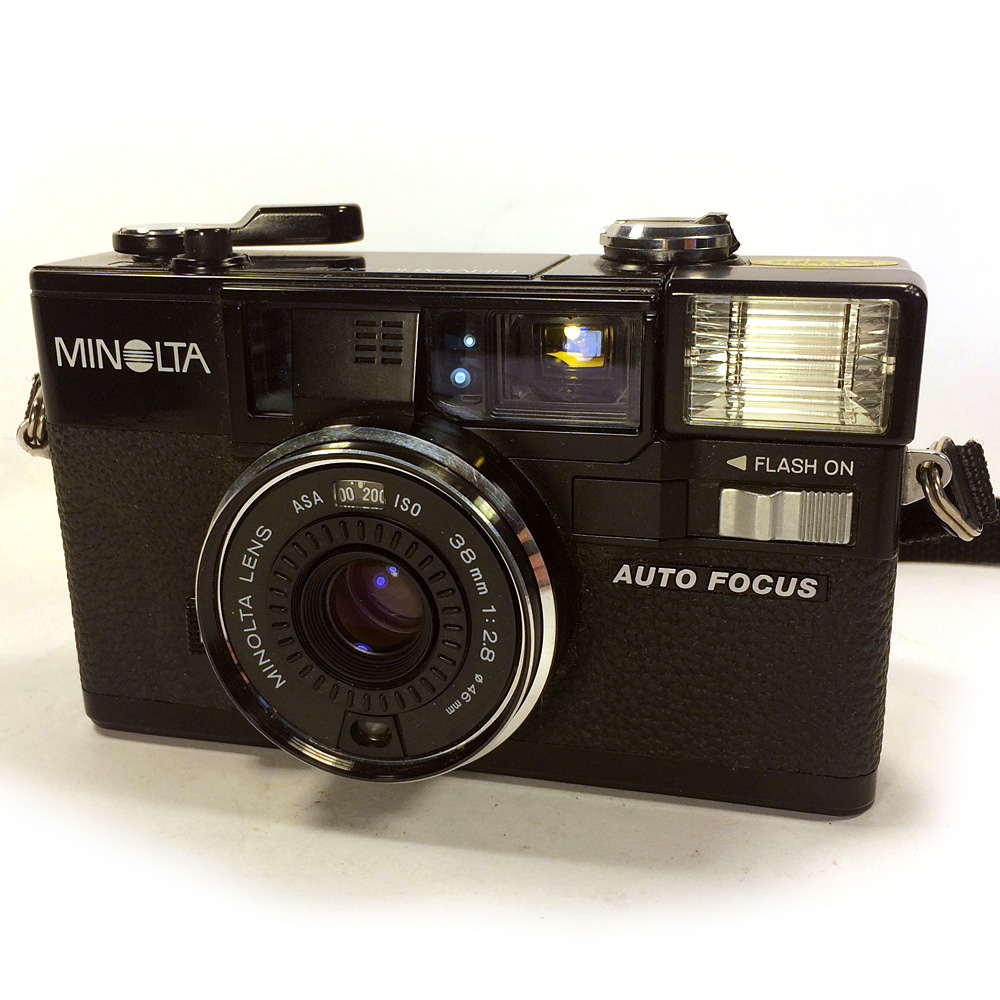
Minolta Hi-Matic AF2 rangefinder camera made in Japan,, 1981

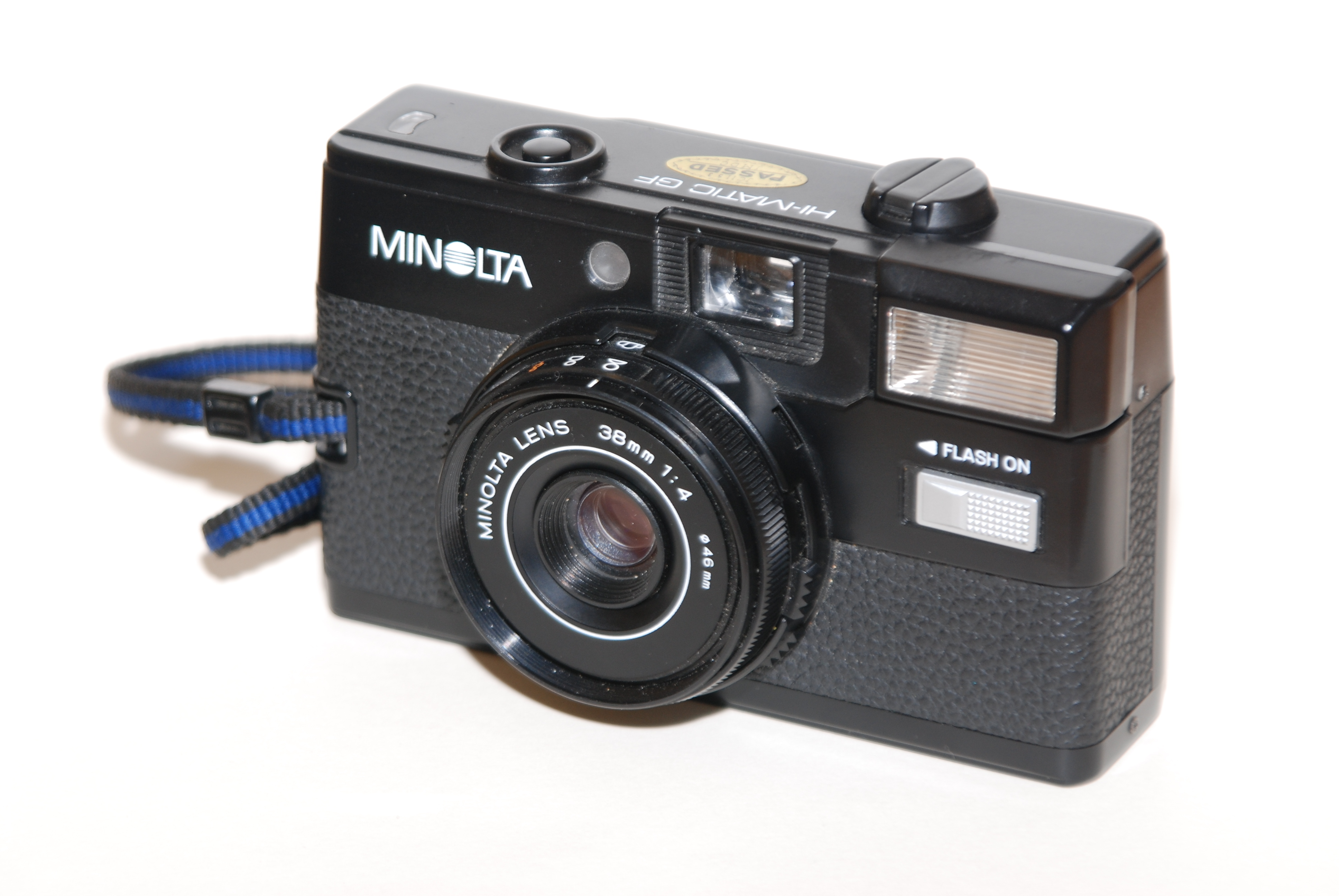
Hi-Matic GF, 1984
