= Second National Bank of Meyersdale =

- U.S. National Register of Historic Places
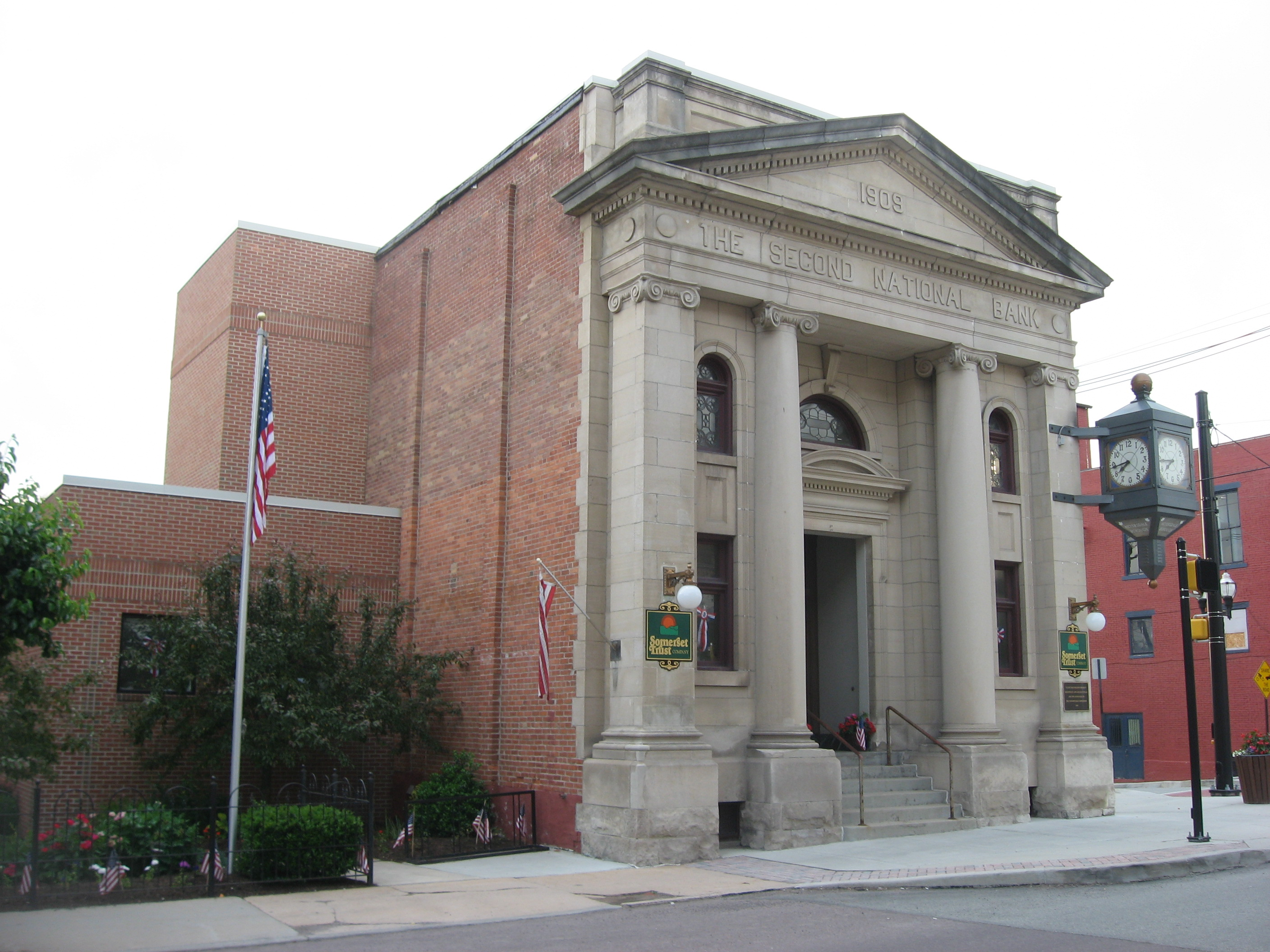
- Front and southern side

- Location within Pennsylvania Location within the United States
- Location: 151 Center St., Meyersdale, Pennsylvania
- Coordinates: 39°48′52″N 79°1′35″W
- Area: less than one acre
- Built: 1909
- Architect: Wright Butler; J.S. Graves
- Architectural style: Classical Revival
- NRHP reference No.: 02000068
- Added to NRHP: February 20, 2002

The Second National Bank of Meyersdale, also known as the Gallatin National Bank and Meyersdale Borough Building, is an historic bank building that is located in Meyersdale, Somerset County, Pennsylvania, United States.

It was added to the National Register of Historic Places in 2002.

== History and architectural features ==
Built in 1909, this historic structure is a two-story brick building with limestone masonry on its primary elevations. It measures sixty feet by thirty feet and features matching columns that support a large pediment on the main facade. Designed in the Classical Revival style, this building was restored to its 1909 appearance in 1999, when it was reoccupied by a bank after housing borough offices starting in 1983.
