= Mercury-Atlas 8 =

Manned NASA spacecraft

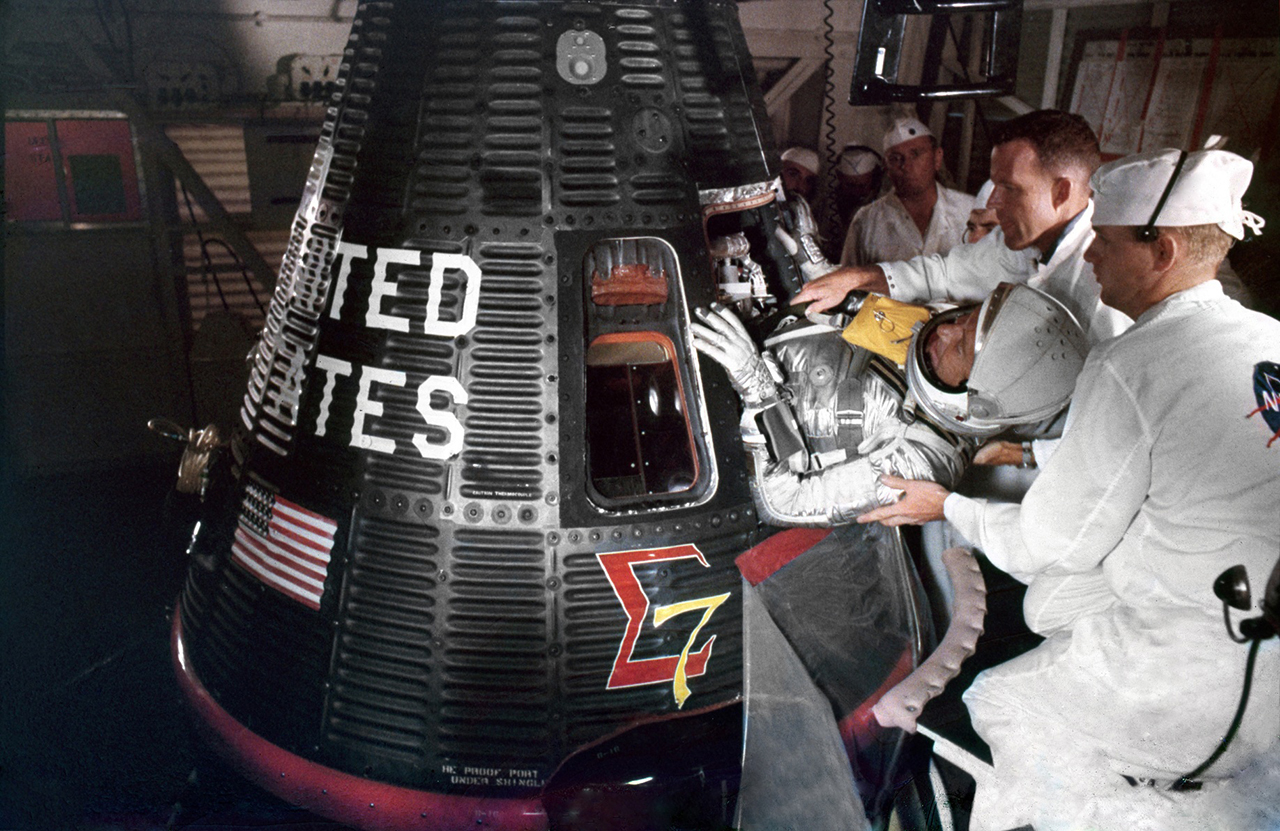
- Schirra entering his MA-8 capsule, Sigma 7
- Mission type: Test flight
- Operator: NASA
- Harvard designation: 1962 Beta Delta 1
- COSPAR ID: 1962-052A
- SATCAT no.: 433
- Mission duration: 9 hours, 13 minutes, 15 seconds
- Orbits completed: 6

Spacecraft properties
- Spacecraft: Mercury No.16
- Manufacturer: McDonnell Aircraft
- Launch mass: 1,964 kilograms (4,329 lb)
- Landing mass: 1,110 kilograms (2,440 lb)
- Dry mass: 1,242–1,374 kilograms (2,739–3,029 lb)

Crew
- Crew size: 1
- Members: Walter M. Schirra Jr.
- Callsign: Sigma 7

Start of mission
- Launch date: October 3, 1962, 12:15:12 UTC
- Rocket: Atlas LV-3B 113-D
- Launch site: Cape Canaveral LC-14

End of mission
- Recovered by: USS Kearsarge
- Landing date: October 3, 1962, 21:28:22 UTC
- Landing site: Central Pacific Ocean

Orbital parameters
- Reference system: Geocentric
- Regime: Low Earth orbit
- Perigee altitude: 156 kilometers (84 nmi)
- Apogee altitude: 285 kilometers (154 nmi)
- Inclination: 32.5 degrees
- Period: 88.91 minutes
- Epoch: October 3, 1962
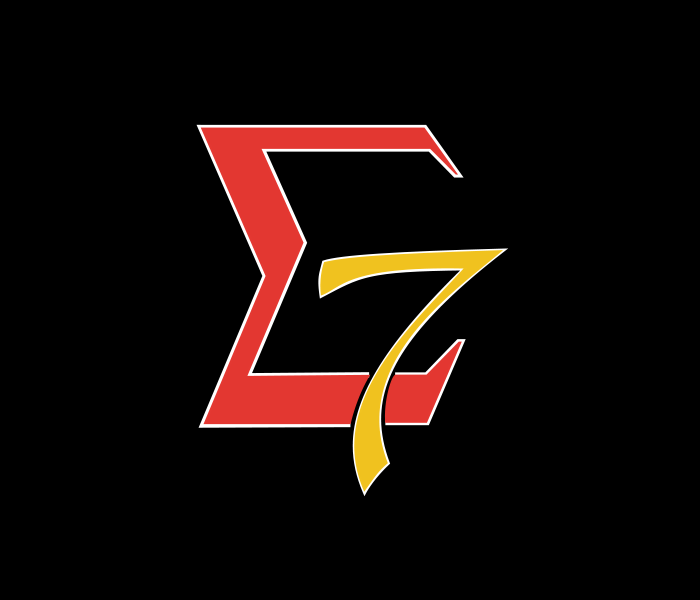
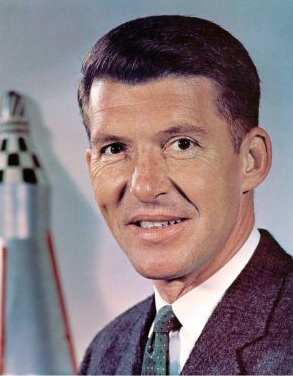
- Spacecraft name as painted on the capsule side Walter "Wally" Marty Schirra Jr. Project Mercury; Crewed missions

Mercury-Atlas 8 (MA-8) was the fifth United States crewed space mission, part of NASA's Mercury program. Astronaut Walter M. Schirra Jr., orbited the Earth six times in the Sigma 7 spacecraft on October 3, 1962, in a nine-hour flight focused mainly on technical evaluation rather than on scientific experimentation. This was the longest U.S. crewed orbital flight yet achieved in the Space Race, though well behind the several-day record set by the Soviet Vostok 3 earlier in the year. It confirmed the Mercury spacecraft's durability ahead of the one-day Mercury-Atlas 9 mission that followed in 1963.

Planning began for the third U.S. orbital mission in February 1962, aiming for a six-or-seven-orbit flight to build on the previous three-orbit missions. NASA officially announced the mission on June 27, and the flight plan was finalized in late July. The mission focused on engineering tests rather than on scientific experimentation. The mission finally launched on the morning of October 3, having been delayed two weeks because of problems with the Atlas booster. A series of minor booster problems during launch and a faulty temperature controller in Schirra's pressure suit were the only technical problems noted during the flight. The spacecraft orbited in both automated and passive flight modes for prolonged periods while the pilot monitored it and carried out some minor scientific experiments. After six orbits, the capsule landed in the Pacific Ocean half a mile from the recovery carrier, and was hoisted aboard for Schirra to disembark.

The scientific results of the mission were mixed. The astronaut returned healthy after nine hours of confinement in a low-gravity environment. Observation of the Earth's surface proved unproductive, however, because of heavy cloud cover and bad photographic exposures. The public and political reaction was muted compared with that of earlier missions, as the Cuban Missile Crisis soon eclipsed the Space Race in the news. The mission was a technical success: all the engineering objectives were completed without significant malfunctions, and the spacecraft used even less fuel than expected. This confirmed the capabilities of the Mercury spacecraft and allowed NASA to plan with confidence for a day-long flight, MA-9, which had been an early goal of the Mercury program.

== Mission parameters ==
- Mass: 1,964 kilograms (4,330 lb)
- Perigee: 156 km
- Apogee: 285 km
- Inclination: 32.5°
- Period: 88.91 min

== Background ==
By 1962, both the United States and the Soviet Union had flown two solo spaceflights in the Space Race. There was a widespread perception, however, that the United States was falling behind; its two missions had been suborbital and had lasted only a few minutes. The Soviet missions had both orbited the Earth, and the second, Vostok 2, had remained in orbit for a full day. Using the new high-powered Atlas booster, the coming orbital Mercury missions were expected to reduce the gap between the two countries.

NASA announced the first two orbital missions at the end of November 1961, shortly after the Mercury-Atlas 5 (MA-5) test flight, which had carried a chimpanzee and twice orbited the Earth. MA-6 was planned as the first orbital flight, with John Glenn as the primary crew and Scott Carpenter as his backup. The follow-up mission, MA-7, was to be crewed by Deke Slayton, with Wally Schirra as his backup. In February 1962, the first draft planning began for MA-8, the third orbital mission, with a goal of "six or seven" orbits, as an intermediate step towards a day-long 18-orbit flight. The decision to move to six orbits rather than seven was driven by the mission rules on contingency recovery operations; a seventh orbit would have required significant additional recovery forces to be able to reach the capsule anywhere on its trajectory within eighteen hours. The six-orbit profile had other effects on the recovery plans; the optimum recovery point was moved to the Pacific Ocean, rather than the Atlantic.

On March 15, 1962, NASA announced that Slayton was medically unfit and would be replaced by Scott Carpenter as the prime crew for the MA-7 mission. The decision to replace him with Carpenter, rather than his official backup Schirra, was justified by the large amount of training Carpenter had managed while preparing for the long-delayed MA-6 mission. After the success of the MA-6 and MA-7 missions, both of three orbits, pressure began to mount to fly an extended mission. On June 27, 1962, NASA first announced its plan for the upcoming MA-8 mission, which would last for "as many as six" orbits. Schirra was named as the prime crew for MA-8, with Gordon Cooper as his backup, repeating the backup-one fly-one pattern set by the previous two missions. The pattern would be repeated for MA-9, flown by Cooper, and the planned but cancelled MA-10, which would have been flown by Cooper's backup, Alan Shepard.

The Soviet Union had not flown any further flights by the time MA-7 landed, putting both sides of the Space Race even at two orbital flights each. While the Soviets had flown for longer, the Mercury program was gaining momentum, with a six-orbit mission currently planned and press speculation about a one-day mission. However, in mid-August, the Soviet Union launched two orbital missions, Vostok 3 and Vostok 4, within a day of each other. The two craft were in intersecting orbits, but despite much speculation did not attempt to rendezvous; they completed missions of 64 and 48 orbits respectively, just under four and three days, landing within a few minutes of each other on August 15. This was far ahead of anything currently planned for Mercury, and NASA quickly considered the prospect of modifying a capsule to have an active manoeuvring and rendezvous capability, using technology being developed for the Gemini program. However, after examining the time and safety implications of this proposal, it was decided to abandon the idea and continue with the planned six-orbit mission.

=== Mission objectives ===
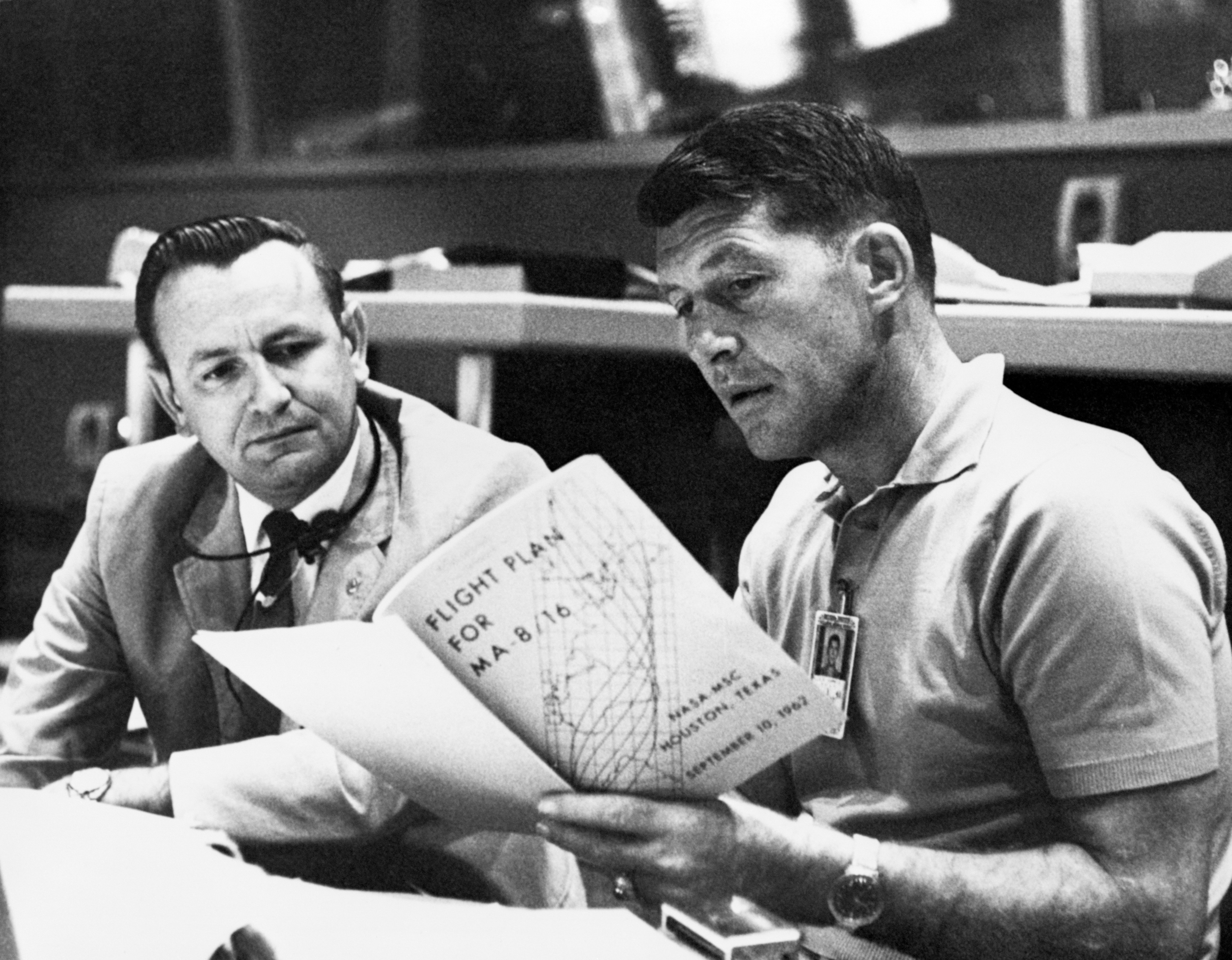
Schirra (right) discussing the flight plan with flight director Chris Kraft.

The original MA-8 flight plan was issued on July 27; although it was revised slightly in August and September, it remained broadly unchanged until launch. This was an improvement on the situation with MA-7, which had had frequent and extensive alterations, making it difficult for the pilot to train efficiently. The aim was for the flight to be an engineering-oriented mission, focusing on the operation of the spacecraft rather than on scientific experimentation, to help pave the way for a future long-duration mission.

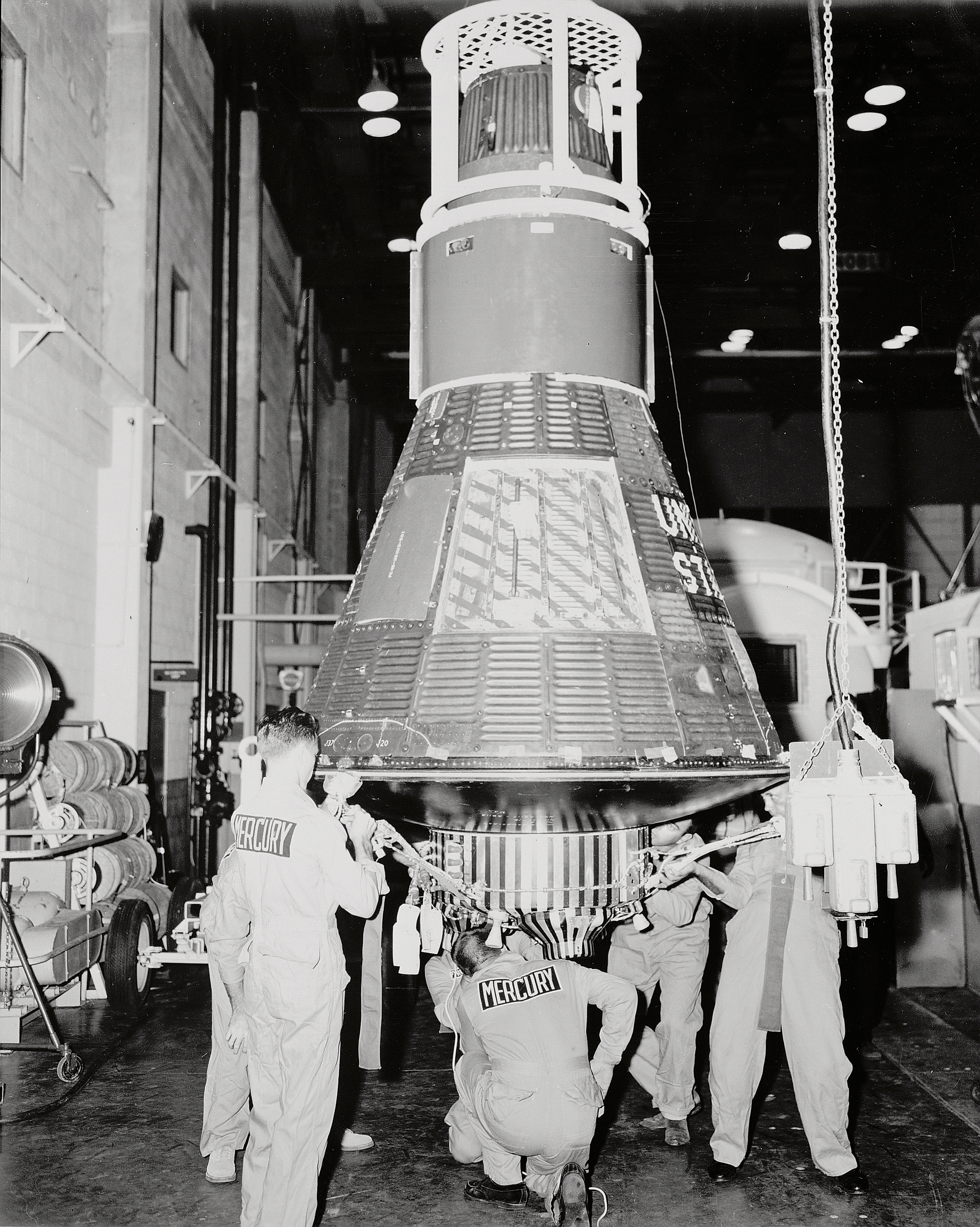
Sigma 7 in its hangar

The mission objectives involved evaluating the performance of the spacecraft over six orbits, as well as the effect of prolonged microgravity on the pilot. The specific spacecraft systems would also be evaluated and tested, and the worldwide tracking and communications network would be tested to see how well it would stand up in an extended mission. The flight control experiments included manually turning the spacecraft around, yaw and pitch manoeuvres to determine how easy it was to control the spacecraft attitude, realignment of the onboard gyroscopes in flight, and leaving the spacecraft to drift on-orbit.

Four non-engineering scientific experiments were planned, two requiring the active involvement of the astronaut and two completely passive. The first involved the astronaut watching for four high-powered flares while passing over Woomera, Australia, and for a xenon arc lamp while passing over Durban, South Africa. The second involved two sets of photographs to be taken using a 70mm Hasselblad camera as well as conventional color photographs of the Earth from orbit. Focusing on geological features and cloud patterns, photographs were to be taken through a set of colored filters provided by the U. S. Weather Bureau. The latter were intended to help calibrate the spectral reflectivity of clouds and surface features, which in turn would help improve the cameras on future weather satellites. The passive experimentation packages were two sets of radiation-sensitive photographic films, from the Goddard Space Flight Center and the U. S. Navy School of Aviation Medicine, and a set of eight different experimental ablative materials attached to the outside of the spacecraft to test their performance during re-entry.

=== Naming ===
For his spacecraft, Schirra originally favored the name Phoenix, while his wife championed Pioneer. He ultimately dubbed the vessel Sigma 7 because, as the mathematical symbol for the summation of elements, the name reflected that "the flight was the sum of the efforts and energies of a lot of people."

The seven appended to the end was in honor of the seven original astronauts selected for Mercury, a tradition inadvertently started by prior Mercury pilot, Alan Shepard, who incorporated the seven in "Freedom 7" as his spacecraft was factory model no. 7. The other astronauts liked the symbolism, and so each added 7 to their spacecraft names as well.. The nose art with the sigma logo was painted by Cece Bibby.

=== Spacecraft modifications ===
The spacecraft and booster were almost identical to those used on the two preceding Mercury orbital flights. The spacecraft had heating blankets removed from the retrorocket motors, to save weight, and a SOFAR bomb was added. This would be ejected at the time the main parachute was deployed, and would help recovery crews find the spacecraft after it landed. A number of modifications were made to the reaction control system, and the communications equipment was upgraded.

The Atlas booster (Vehicle 113D) had been modified since the previous flight, and now included baffled fuel injectors and a new hypergolic fuel igniter instead of the original pyrotechnic igniter. This would eliminate problems with combustion instability and allow the booster to be released immediately upon attaining full thrust instead of being held on the pad for a few moments. There were considerable delays getting the vehicle ready for flight. It was supposed to be shipped to Cape Canaveral in July, but after failing the factory composite test at Convair, the planned delivery of the Atlas was delayed a month.

== Mission preparation ==
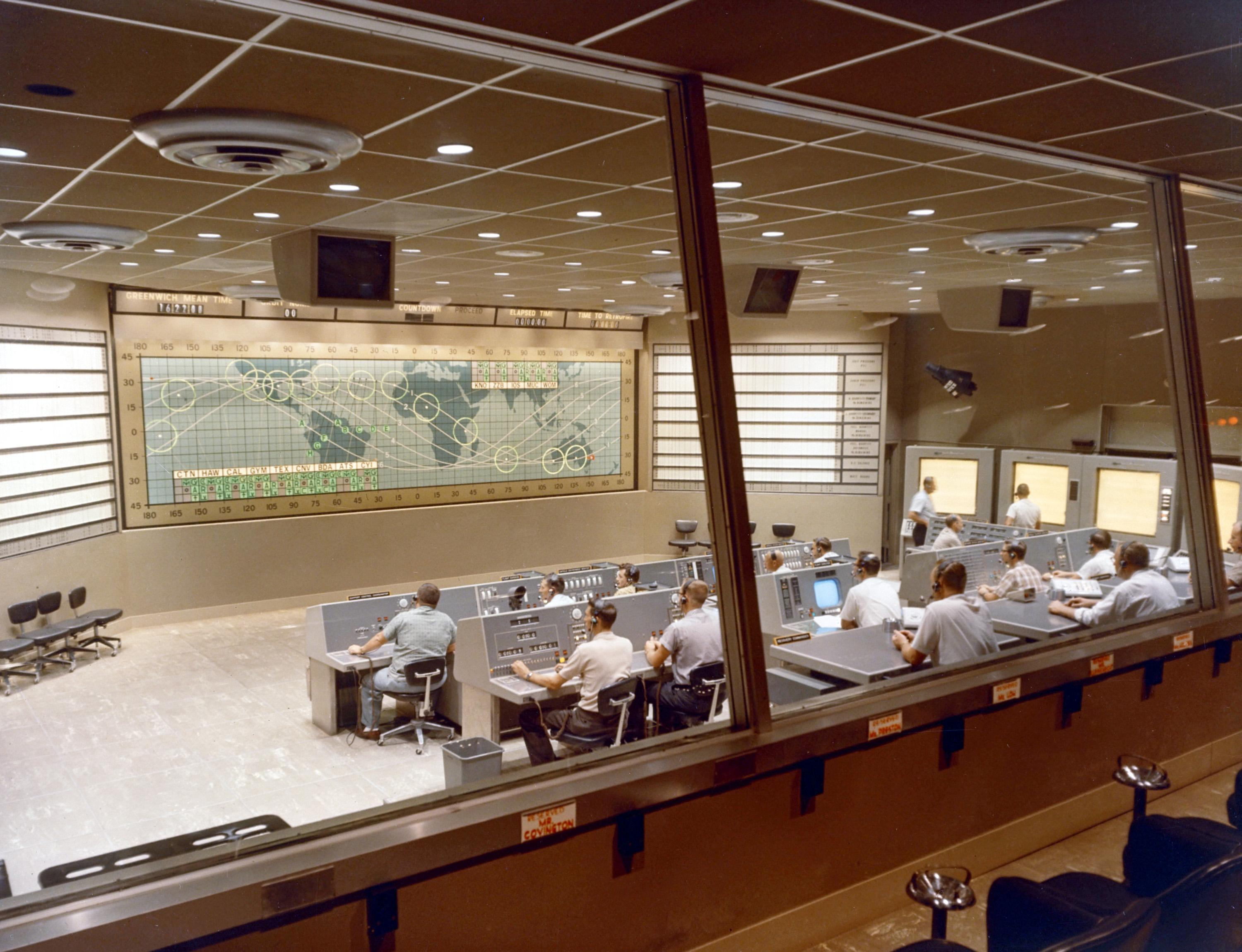
Mercury Control on September 10, 1962, before the first simulated flight

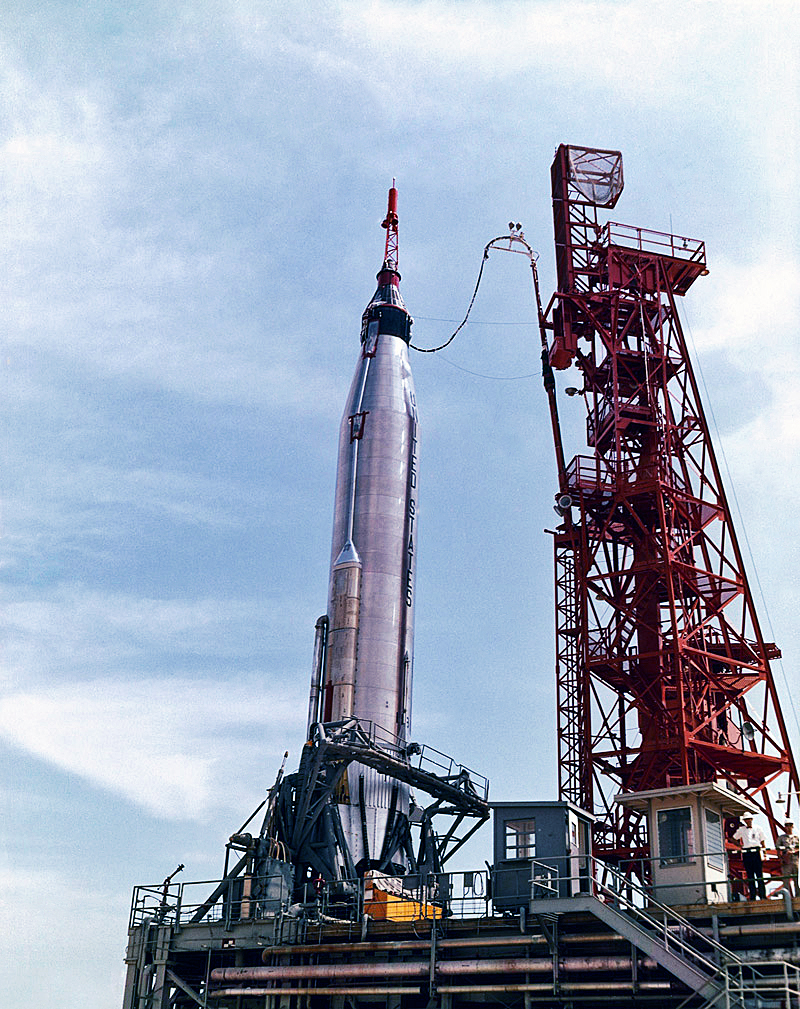
The booster and spacecraft stacked for a simulated launch on September 29

The capsule built for the mission, Mercury Spacecraft No. 16, had been delivered to Cape Canaveral on January 16, 1962. The Atlas LV-3B booster assigned to the mission, No. 113-D, was accepted by NASA at the Convair plant on July 27 and delivered on August 8. After the delayed arrival of the booster at the Cape, the Air Force then revealed that two recent static firings of MA-3 engines had suffered turbopump failures, and that the explosion of Atlas 11F one second after liftoff in April had been traced to a malfunction of the sustainer turbopump. All of these failures had occurred while the sustainer HS valve was moving to the open position and while running untested hardware modifications. The Air Force recommended that NASA conduct a static firing test of 113D just to be on the safe side. On September 6, the tests were scheduled to continue until September 24, which allowed for a probable launch on October 3. A static firing test on the pad would expose the sustainer turbopump to the failure mode in question. In the meantime, a fuel leak caused by a faulty weld in a piece of plumbing caused further delays. The static firing test was carried out on September 8 and the booster reported as ready for assembly on September 18. The Flight Safety Review Board met on September 24 to go over the fifteen Atlas launches since Carpenter's flight, which included three failures. Atlas 67E malfunctioned due to a random quality control fault that would be avoided with the tightly managed Mercury program, and Atlas 145D had sent Mariner 1 into the Atlantic Ocean thanks to a guidance system problem, which was of no concern to Mercury as its boosters used a different model of guidance system. Atlas 57F went off-course and was destroyed by RSO action, but more than a month later, the Air Force had not yet announced any cause of the failure.

Concerns had been raised that the radiation belt produced in orbit by the recent Operation Dominic nuclear tests would be dangerous to crewed space missions, but an extensive study announced in early September declared that it was safe to fly. While the outside of the capsule was expected to receive a dosage of around 500 röntgens, the study concluded that shielding and the effect of the spacecraft structure would reduce this to around 8 röntgens experienced by the astronaut, well within established tolerance limits. (Note: To put this in context, an unprotected dose of 500 röntgens over a few hours would be easily fatal.)

Schirra began training for the mission in early July, logging 29 hours in simulators as well as 31 hours in the spacecraft itself. This included multiple systems tests and three simulated flights, culminating in a six-and-a-half-hour simulated flight on September 29, with the spacecraft and booster fully stacked on the pad. Highlights of the training period included a visit from President John F. Kennedy on September 11.

The mission was reported as ready to go—"except for the weather"—on October 1. The major concern with the weather was a major tropical storm in the Atlantic, though there were also worries over a series of typhoons in the Pacific which could pose a problem for recovery operations. On the evening of October 2, the decision was taken to launch the next morning.

== Launch ==
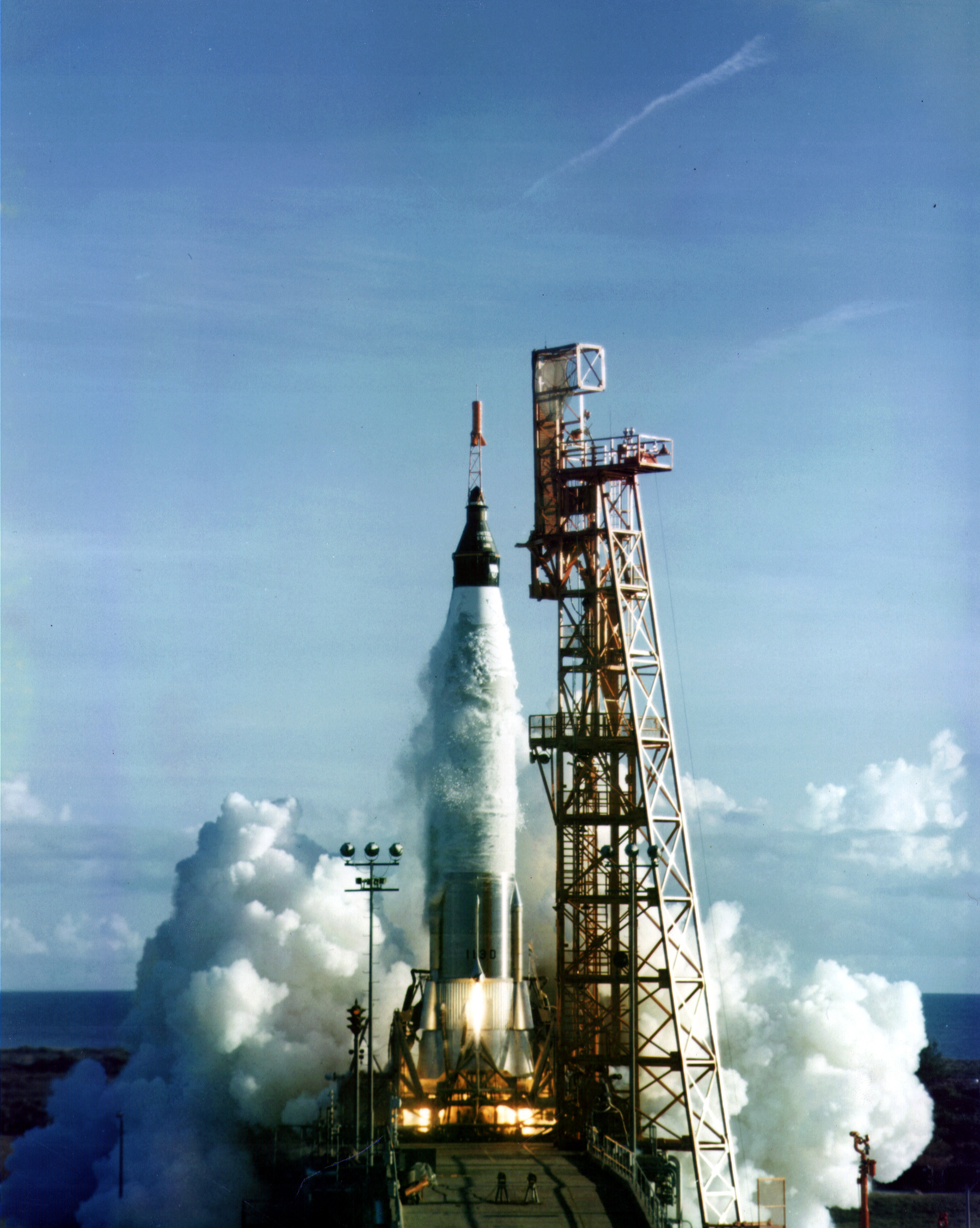
Launch of Mercury-Atlas 8

Schirra was awakened at 1:40 am ET on the morning of October 3, and after a hearty breakfast—including a bluefish he had speared the day before—and a brief physical he left for the launchpad at around 4 am. He entered the spacecraft at 4:41 am ET, where he found a steak sandwich left for him in the 'glove compartment', and began the pre-launch checks. The launch countdown proceeded as planned until 6:15, when there was a 15-minute hold to allow the Canary Islands tracking station to repair a radar set. The countdown resumed at 6:30 and proceeded to booster ignition with no further delays. Liftoff proceeded smoothly, but there was a momentary clockwise roll transient at liftoff, which reached 7.83° per second and approached 80% of the required threshold to trigger the ASIS abort system. This was later identified as being due to a slight misalignment of the main engines and was kept under control by the booster's vernier thrusters. Sustainer engine thrust during the launch was slightly below normal and fuel consumption higher than normal due to a suspected leak in the sustainer fuel system.

Around three and a half minutes into the flight, Deke Slayton, the capsule communicator, cut in to ask Schirra "Are you a turtle today?" Schirra, unfazed, announced that he was switching to the on-board voice recorder (rather than the broadcast radio circuit) to leave his answer; the mission communications transcript noted this as "[correct answer recorded]". The "turtle club" was a recurrent joke among the astronaut corps; on being challenged with this question, the correct response was "you bet your sweet ass I am", with a failure to give the password being punishable by buying a round of drinks. Schirra noted later that he "wasn't ready for all the world to hear it", and chose to use the on-board recorder to avoid saying the answer over the air.

Because the Atlas was flying on a slightly lofted trajectory, the booster engines cut off 2 seconds earlier than planned, but the sustainer engine burned for about 10 seconds longer than intended, giving an extra 15 feet per second (4.6 m/s) of velocity and putting the spacecraft in a slightly higher orbit than planned. Initial analysis of the trajectory confirmed that the capsule could remain in a stable orbit for at least seven orbits, ensuring there would be no need for an early de-orbit.

== Orbital activities ==
After separating from the Atlas booster, Schirra stabilized the spacecraft and slowly cartwheeled into the correct attitude; he deliberately kept the motion slow to conserve fuel, and was able to position the capsule using half a percent of his fuel reserves. He briefly tracked the spent booster, which was rotating slowly past, but made no attempt to move towards it. As the spacecraft moved across the Atlantic, he turned his attention to testing manual control of the spacecraft, which he found sloppy compared to the fly-by-wire system. (Note: Schirra noted after his flight that a rendezvous in orbit would certainly be possible, given sufficient fuel and precise positioning information; he would later go on to fly the Gemini 6A mission, the first successful close rendezvous of two spacecraft.)

Crossing over the eastern coast of Africa, he began to feel overheated; this problem was also apparent to the ground controllers, who were having a debate with the flight surgeon over whether it was safe to continue or if the mission should be ended after the first orbit. The flight director, Christopher Kraft, followed the surgeon's advice to see if the problem would settle, and gave the go for a second orbit. Schirra eventually stabilized the problem over time, slowly dialing the suit's control knob to a high cooling setting; he compared the heat to that of "mowing a lawn in Texas".

Over Australia, Schirra watched for a flare launched from the ground, but it was occluded by clouds; he was, however, able to see lightning and the lit outline of Brisbane. Through the night pass over the Pacific, he tested the capsule's on-board periscope, though he found it difficult to use and quickly covered it up as soon as the sun rose. Crossing over Mexico, he reported that he was in "chimp configuration", with the capsule running entirely on automatic without any input from the pilot, and as he began his second orbit began testing a yaw maneuver using the Earth through the main window as a reference, rather than via the much-maligned periscope.

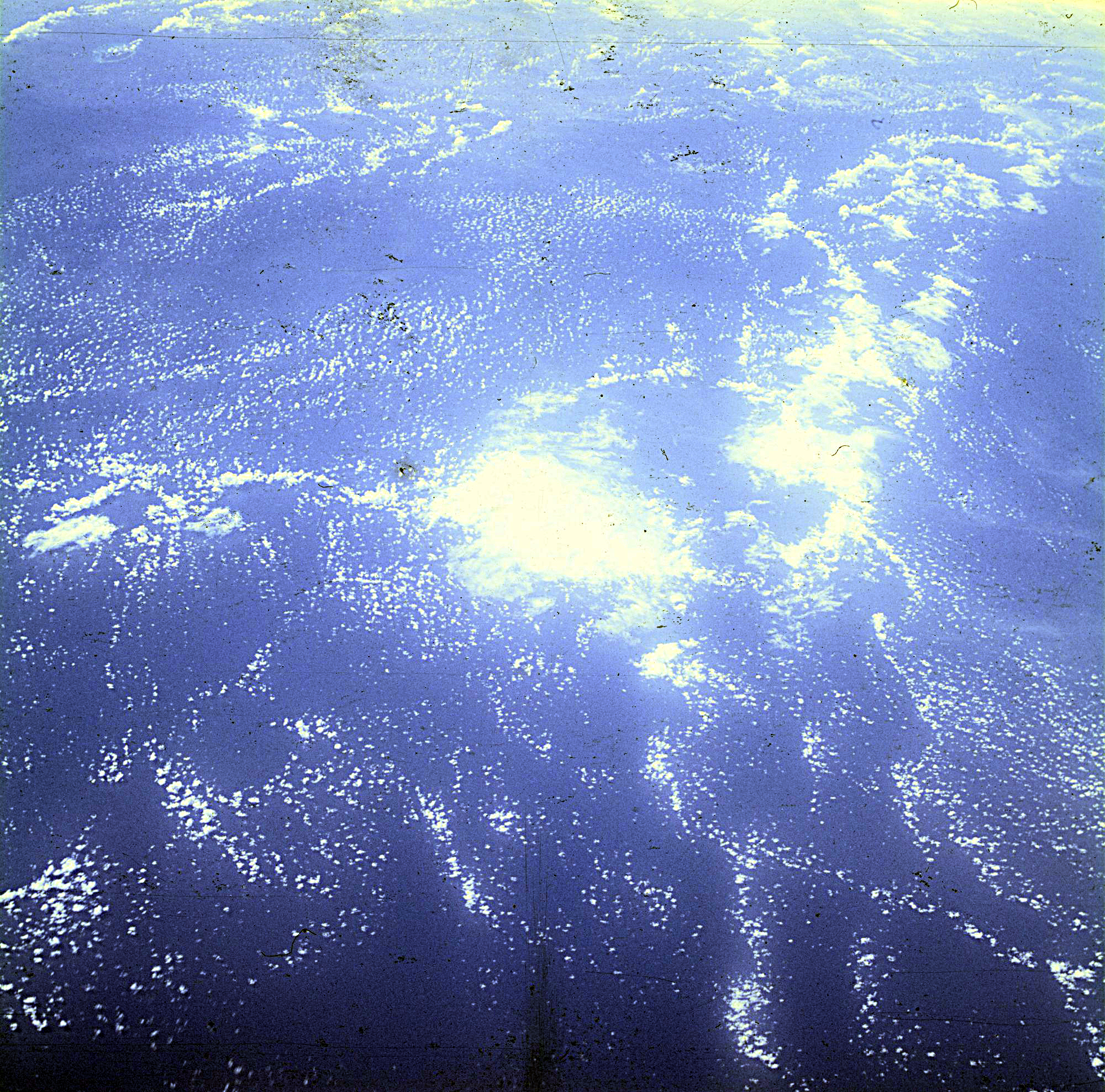
Cumulus clouds photographed from orbit

On the second orbit, he confirmed the existence of Glenn's "fireflies", the shower of small bright particles first reported on MA-6, and during the night section practiced yaw manoeuvres using first the Moon and then known stars as reference points. The second proved difficult to work with, as the small windows of the Mercury capsule gave a very limited field of view, making it hard to identify constellations. Travelling across the Pacific, he again fell back into automatic flight, chatting with Gus Grissom at the Hawaiian tracking station about the qualities of the manual control system.

As he began the third orbit, Schirra disconnected the spacecraft's gyroscopes, turned off part of the electrical power system, and let the capsule drift. He took advantage of this quiet period to test his spatial awareness and motor control, which he found was broadly unaffected by weightlessness, and to eat a light meal. He powered the spacecraft back up over the Indian Ocean, and continued over the Pacific. At Hawaii, he was given clearance for a full six-orbit mission, and as he crossed over towards California shut down the electrical power for a second period of drifting flight, during which he occupied himself taking photographs with the onboard camera.

On the fourth orbit, drifting in an inverted spacecraft with the Earth 'above' him, Schirra continued his photography and attempted—unsuccessfully—to spot the Echo 1 satellite while passing over East Africa. As he approached California, he spoke briefly to John Glenn in a two-minute conversation broadcast live across the United States on radio and television. Problems began to recur with the pressure suit, with water condensing on the faceplate; Schirra, concerned about the internal temperature, avoided opening the visor to clean it for fear that the suit temperature would misbehave again.

By the fifth orbit, Schirra had begun to relax, commenting that it was the first rest he had had since December 1961. He used a small bungee cord exercise device for "a little bit of stretching", before dropping into manual attitude control, where he reported a sudden burst of oversteering and high fuel use. Over the Atlantic he returned to observation and photography; he failed to spot the planned high-power light near Durban, in South Africa, due to cloud cover, but did make out the brightly lit city of Port Elizabeth. Over the Philippines, he reported on his fuel status; after four and a half of the planned six orbits, he still had eighty percent remaining in both manual and automatic fuel tanks. Passing over Quito, Ecuador, towards the end of his fifth orbit, Schirra was asked by the tracking station if he had any message to pass on "in Spanish to the fellows down here", and he made some comments on how beautiful the country appeared from orbit, ending with a cheery "Buenos Dias, y'all!" Schirra later noted that he was "furious" at this point—he was preparing for re-entry and didn't want to be distracted with making public statements.

The sixth orbit was dominated by preparations for re-entry, though Schirra was able to take a last set of photographs of South America and try another set of spatial-orientation tests. He armed the retrorockets passing over the western Pacific, and fired the first one at 8:52 mission elapsed time. The automatic control system held the capsule "steady as a rock" during this period, though after the retrorockets had stopped firing Schirra noted that the system had burned almost a quarter of its fuel in the process.

== Reentry and recovery ==
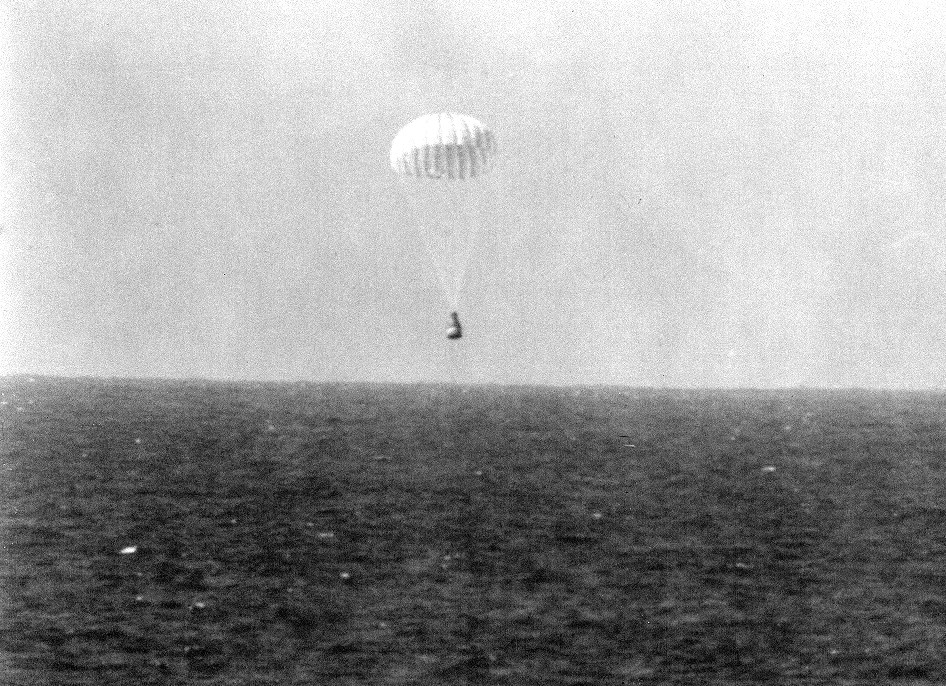
Parachute landing

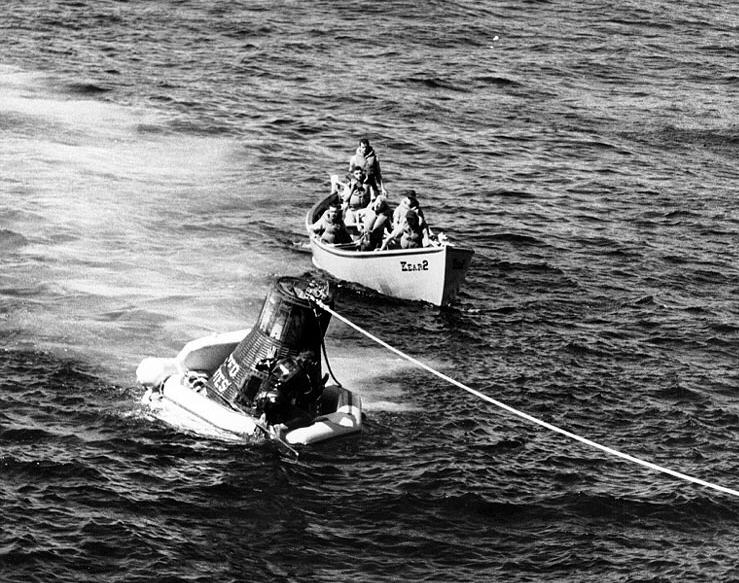
Sigma 7 being towed to Kearsarge

As the spacecraft continued towards re-entry after the de-orbit burn, Schirra used the high-power thrusters to put the capsule in the correct orientation, noting that the attitude control felt "sloppy". He then enabled the rate stabilization control system, an automatic control method which used up fuel at a very high rate, to maintain control during re-entry; this was a specific engineering request, and it dismayed Schirra to see the fuel he had husbanded for six orbits be used so quickly.

The local recovery group in the prime target area, in the central Pacific, consisted of an aircraft carrier, USS Kearsarge, in the center of the landing area, with three destroyers strung out along the orbital path. Four search aircraft were also assigned to the area, and three recovery helicopters were based aboard Kearsarge.

Kearsarge picked up the capsule on radar while still 200 miles (320 km) from landing; 90 miles (140 km) further up the landing path, the destroyer USS Renshaw reported a sonic boom as it passed overhead. At 40,000 feet (12,000 m), Schirra deployed the drogue parachute, and then the main parachute at 15,000 feet (4,600 m). The landing was surprisingly precise, 4.5 miles (7.2 km) from the target point and 0.5 miles (0.80 km) from Kearsarge, and Schirra joked that he was on course for the recovery carrier's "number three elevator". The capsule hit the water, submerged, and bobbed to the surface again, righting itself after about 30 seconds. Three pararescue swimmers were dropped by one of the helicopters to help him climb out, but Schirra radioed that he would prefer to be towed to the carrier, and a whaleboat from Kearsarge was sent with a line.

Forty minutes after landing, Sigma 7 was hoisted aboard Kearsarge; five minutes later, Schirra blew the explosive hatch and climbed out to a waiting crowd. After doing this, examinations showed clear bruising on his hand from operating the heavy ejector switch, which he felt provided an important vindication for fellow pilot Gus Grissom's hatch expulsion accident during the Liberty Bell 7 mission. Grissom had maintained that the hatch blew without his input; the fact that he had no bruising was seen as evidence that he had not blown the hatch early and sunk his capsule, but that it was a mechanical malfunction. Schirra remained aboard for three days of medical tests and debriefing before disembarking, while the spacecraft was offloaded at Midway Island and transferred to an aircraft for further transport. It was returned to Cape Canaveral for analysis, with the long-term intention of putting it on permanent display.

The spent Atlas booster re-entered the atmosphere on October 4, the day after the launch, and burned up.

== Post-flight ==
The post-flight analysis reported no major malfunctions—the only troublesome anomaly being the suit temperature controls— and all the engineering objectives of the mission were deemed successfully completed. The fuel-conservation measures were found to have worked particularly well, with even less fuel than anticipated being consumed; despite the technical changes, the official report gave full credit for this to the pilot. The medical analysis found no significant physiological effects from nine hours of weightlessness, and noted that Schirra had received no significant radiation exposure. Analysis of the radiation-sensitive plates confirmed that there had been a very low radioactive flux inside the spacecraft, (Note: Further analysis was presented in Schaefer, Hermann J.; Sullivan, Jeremiah J. (May 25, 1964). Measurements of the astronauts' radiation exposure with nuclear emulsion on Mercury missions MA-8 and MA-9 (PDF) (Technical report). hdl:2060/19670009820. OCLC 1369497796. CR-82574. Archived (PDF) from the original on December 25, 2025.) and the six ablative materials tested were all deemed broadly satisfactory despite some difficulty comparing them to each other.

Scientifically, the light-observation experiments were unsuccessful, as both target locations were covered by thick cloud cover. However, Schirra was able to view lightning near Woomera, and noted the lights of a city a few hundred miles from Durban. The filtered photography for the Weather Bureau worked as planned, with 15 photographs taken; the conventional color photography was less successful, with several of the 14 photographs unusable due to overexposure or excess cloud cover. In the end, the conventional photographs were not used for scientific examination due to these problems. Schirra noted that the sheer amount of cloud coverage, worldwide, could provide problems for future activity of this kind; however, Africa, and the south-western United States, were perfectly clear. Postflight medical examination of Schirra disclosed nothing significant other than a degree of orthostatic hypotension caused by sitting inside the cramped capsule for hours.

Schirra's post-flight report noted the "fireflies" seen on the previous two missions, and emphasized the remarkable visual effect of the thick band of the atmosphere visible around the horizon. However, he was unimpressed with the view of Earth from space; the amount of detail he could make out compared well with that from high-flying aircraft, and he told debriefers that it was "nothing new" compared to flight at 50,000 feet (15,000 m). Overall, he concluded that Sigma 7 was on "the top of the list" of aircraft he had flown, displacing the F8F Bearcat, a naval piston-engined fighter, (Note: The Bearcat was the first fighter Schirra had flown after training, and he remembered it as "not a plane you climb into; rather, you strap it on".) while the mission itself had been "textbook".

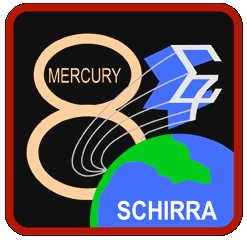
Mission insignia

Schirra gave a public lecture at Rice University after returning to Houston, where he received a motorcade through the city. However, the Cuban Missile Crisis had been steadily escalating through September, and helped drive discussion of Schirra's successful flight down the news schedules; public concern about the relative effectiveness of Soviet and American space launchers was displaced by a more pressing concern over Soviet military rockets. He visited Washington, D.C., to receive the NASA Distinguished Service Medal from President Kennedy on October 16, the same day Kennedy had first seen U-2 photographs of missile sites in Cuba; the meeting was friendly and informal despite the circumstances. Robert F. Kennedy, Schirra later noted, took him aside and sounded him out about a potential political career, the same way he had sounded out John Glenn a year earlier. Unlike Glenn, however, Schirra politely turned the suggestion down, and chose to remain with NASA. His later career saw him commanding the backup crew for the first Gemini mission in 1965, then the prime crew for the Gemini 6A mission later that year, where he flew the first active rendezvous between two spacecraft—earlier plans for it to conduct the first on-orbit docking had been cancelled—and finally commanding the first Apollo mission, Apollo 7, in 1968. He retired from NASA in the summer of 1969, the only astronaut to fly on Mercury, Gemini, and Apollo.

The success of MA-8 made the preparation for MA-9 "considerably easier", though it did cause some observers to suggest the program should be ended abruptly in order to conclude on a clear note of success, rather than risking another—potentially catastrophic—flight. However, this was not a view shared by the NASA planners, who had been pressing for a one-day Mercury mission since mid-1961, when it first began to seem technically feasible. To prepare the spacecraft for a long-duration mission involved trimming as much on-board weight as possible to offset the additional consumables required. The changes made to the capsule hardware on MA-8 were now used to justify the removal of 12 pounds (5.4 kg) of control equipment and 5 pounds (2.3 kg) of radio equipment, as well as the 76 pounds (34 kg) periscope which Schirra had found so unhelpful. In total, there were 183 alterations listed between the capsules for the MA-8 and MA-9 missions. The spacecraft was to be equipped with several cameras, building on Schirra's photographic work, though weight and power limitations did restrict the amount of scientific experiments that could be scheduled.

== Spacecraft location ==
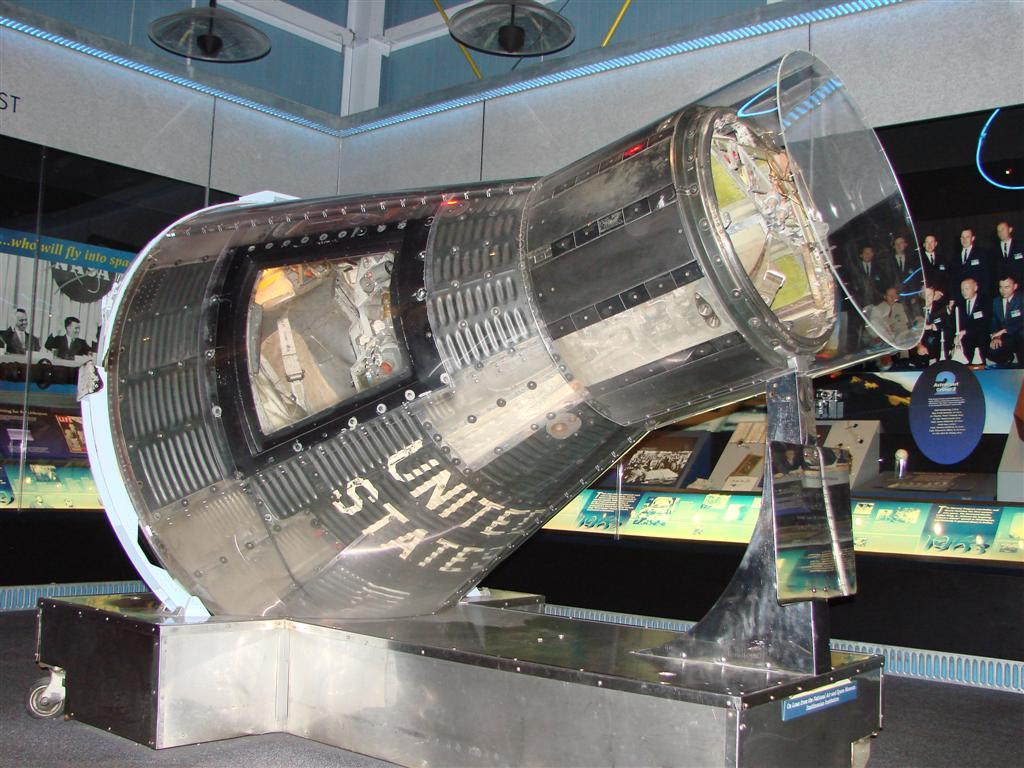
Sigma 7 on display, 2007

After display at the U.S. Space & Rocket Center and Johnson Space Center, the capsule was moved to the United States Astronaut Hall of Fame near Titusville, Florida. Since the recent relocation of the Astronaut Hall of Fame to the Kennedy Space Center Visitor Complex, Sigma 7 has most recently been placed on display at the complex's new Heroes and Legends Hall.
