= Cece Bibby =

American artist

Cecelia Bibby
- Bibby painting the Aurora 7 insignia on the Mercury-7 capsule
- Born: February 20, 1928; Los Angeles, California, US
- Died: November 14, 2012 (aged 84); Blue Ridge, Georgia, US
- Other name: Cece Bibby
- Occupation: Artist
- Employer: NASA

Cecelia "Cece" Bibby (20 February, 1928 - 14 November 2012) was an American artist, primarily known for her artwork on the Mercury space capsules. She was the first woman to be permitted on the launch pad, and was the artist responsible for designing the insignia for the first US crewed orbital spacecraft in 1962. She was also responsible for some of the artwork that appeared in NASA's employee newspaper, Space News Roundup.

== Early life ==
Bibby spent much of her early years as a ward of the Freemasons, having lost her father at an early age. At the Masonic Home for Children, she developed her passion for art.

== Personal life ==
Bibby and Wally Schirra, painting the logo on Mercury-8.

Bibby left NASA in 1970, and moved to Blue Ridge, Georgia, with her naval officer husband. In her latter years, her popularity went through a revival as she travelled the country to autograph events, meeting some of the original Gemini crew and creating new versions of the original artwork.

== See also ==
- Nose art
