= Ancient and Honorable Order of Turtles =

American joke fraternity

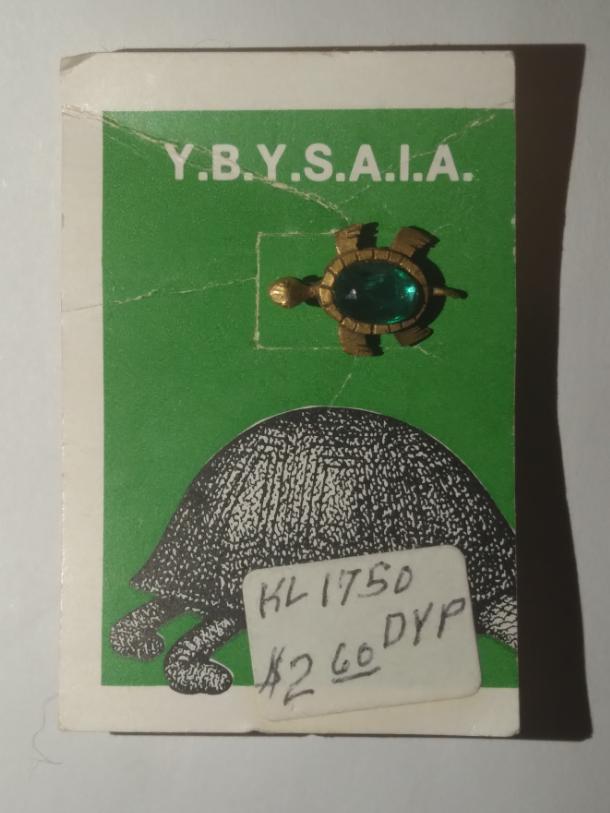
- Lapel pin worn by members of the Order

Awarded by any Member
- Type: Informal and formal groups
- Established: During WWII
- Motto: Are you a Turtle?

The Ancient and Honorable Order of Turtles ("International Association of Turtles", "Turtle Club" or similar title) started as an informal "drinking club" between American World War II pilots, for humor and camaraderie. Any member who was asked "Are you a Turtle?" needed to reply, loudly, "You bet your sweet ass I am", or buy the questioner a drink. The Turtle Club also has a number of membership cards with instructions on recruiting new members, which requires asking three to four riddles for which it is difficult to think up answers other than the obvious vulgar ones. The answer to "What goes in hard and comes out soft" is "gum". It was historically exclusively a men's group. It is an amorphous group and is organized formally in some places and loosely in others, and is popular in bars.

== History ==
The Order of Turtles began as a drinking club formed by WWII pilots for humorous reasons, as well as camaraderie. According to Denis P. McGowan of the "Ancient and Honorable Order of Turtles", his father, the late Captain Hugh P. McGowan, U.S. Army Air Corps/U.S. Air Force Reserve (Ret.) and several pilots of the U.S. Army Air Corps 8th Air Force founded the Ancient and Honorable Order of Turtles in an officers' club while stationed in England during the Second World War. According to Captain McGowan: "We were flying daytime bombing missions over Hitler's Third Reich. We just wanted a little fun. We had seen a sign showing that the 'Ancient Order of Foresters' and the 'Royal Antediluvian Order of Buffaloes' would meet in the local pub, so I devised the name 'Ancient and Honorable Order of Turtles' for the fun of it. It was not meant to be serious, it had no constitution or by-laws, and was a relief from the horrors and dangers we saw every day on our missions. It spread after the War through the VFW and American Legion posts, and eventually, to Masonic groups, colleges and even to the high schools of the U.S.A".

== Qualifying questions ==
To gain admission, one must correctly answer usually three or four questions from a list, each of which suggests a vulgar, lewd, or salacious answer, but the correct answer is innocuous. It is assumed that all prospective Turtles own a jackass; therefore once inducted, a member must reply to the question "Are you a Turtle?" with "You bet your sweet ass I am." If the member is unable or unwilling (due to its vulgarity) to provide the correct answer, they owe to each other turtle present a drink of the recipient's choice. A large part of the tradition of the order involves the qualifying questions that prospective members have to answer. These fun questions are actually small riddles: each suggests a vulgar or lewd answer, but the candidate has to give an innocuous answer.

An example would be the question

What does a woman do sitting down, that a dog does on three legs, and a man does standing up?

The obvious answer to this question would be "pee" or "urinate", but the correct answer is "shake hands", as traditional western etiquette demands that a man needs to rise from his seat to shake hands, while a woman needs not. Some additional questions are:

- What does a cow have four of and a woman only two? (Legs)
- What is a four letter word ending in K that means to have intercourse? (Talk)
- What is it on a man that is round and hard, and sticks so far out of his pajamas that you can hang a hat on it? (Head)

A candidate must answer four of these questions. There are a variety of alternative sets of questions that are asked instead of these, and some organizations ask three instead of four questions.

== Historical references ==
During the 1962 Mercury-Atlas 8 mission (part of the United States space program), astronaut Wally Schirra was asked by ground controller Deke Slayton whether he was a turtle. Not wanting to use vulgar language while his communications were being broadcast worldwide, he temporarily stopped transmitting in order to record the required response. Later, on board the recovery ship USS Kearsarge, in front of Slayton, Walt Williams and the other astronauts, Walt Williams demanded to know how Schirra replied to Deke's question. Schirra played the recorder. "Hey, Wally, are you a turtle?" followed by the proper response, "YBYSAIA".

In 1968, on the Apollo 7 mission, during seven telecasts which were the first video broadcasts from a spacecraft, Schirra instead asked Slayton, through the capcom, whether he was a turtle. Slayton in turn also recorded his answer. According to the Apollo 7 mission transcript, he also asked if Paul Haney was a turtle, to which Schirra replied that Haney was buying, not talking. The Smithsonian owns a turtle membership card changed to call the organization the "Interstellar Association of Turtles: Outershell Division" signed by Wally Schirra and TRW employee Gerry Morton.

President John F. Kennedy was also allegedly asked if he was a Turtle at a press conference, to which he replied, "I'll buy you your drink later".

== In pop culture ==
- In 1969, Dial Records released the 45rpm single "Are You a Turtle" by rock/soul group The Brotherhood, fronted by Ben Thayer. The single (Dial #4092) became a regional hit in the Southeast.
- In the 1975 three-novel collection The Illuminatus! Trilogy by Robert Shea and Robert Anton Wilson, references to the order are made various times including this one involving Lady Velkor: "Lady Velkor, wearing a green peasant blouse and green hotpants, looked around the geodesic KoolAid dome. A man in a green turtleneck sweater and green slacks caught her eye, and she walked over to him, asking, "Are you a turtle?" "You bet your sweet ass I am," he answered eagerly and so she had failed to make contact— and owed this oaf a free drink also. But she smiled pleasantly and concealed her annoyance."
- In the 1997 novel Timequake, Kurt Vonnegut tells John Hickenlooper (son of one of Vonnegut's fraternity brothers) of their asking for the password during "solemn and sacred occasion[s], such as the swearing in of new fraternity brothers."
- In the 2002 film Master of Disguise starring Dana Carvey, he says in a scene, "Am I not turtley enough for the turtle club?"
- On Dick Whittinghill's radio show on KMPC in Los Angeles, one of his recurring gags was a sound bite of someone asking, "Are you a turtle?"
