= Mercury-Atlas 7 =

1962 crewed spaceflight within NASA's Project Mercury

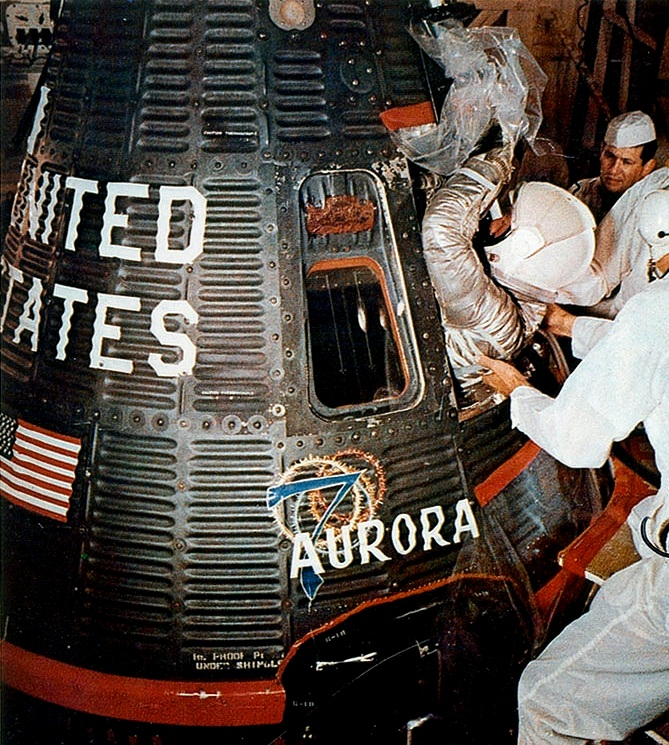
- Carpenter entering his MA-7 capsule, Aurora 7
- Mission type: Test flight
- Operator: NASA
- Harvard designation: 1962 Tau 1
- COSPAR ID: 1962-019A
- SATCAT no.: 295
- Mission duration: 4 hours, 56 minutes, 5 seconds
- Distance travelled: 122,344 kilometers (76,021 mi)
- Orbits completed: 3

Spacecraft properties
- Spacecraft: Mercury No.18
- Manufacturer: McDonnell Aircraft
- Launch mass: 1,350.0 kilograms (2,976.2 lb)

Crew
- Crew size: 1
- Members: M. Scott Carpenter
- Callsign: Aurora 7

Start of mission
- Launch date: May 24, 1962, 12:45:16 UTC
- Rocket: Atlas LV-3B 107-D
- Launch site: Cape Canaveral LC-14

End of mission
- Recovered by: USS Intrepid
- Landing date: May 24, 1962, 17:41:21 UTC
- Landing site: North-east of Puerto Rico, Caribbean Sea

Orbital parameters
- Reference system: Geocentric
- Regime: Low Earth orbit
- Perigee altitude: 154 kilometers (83 nmi)
- Apogee altitude: 259 kilometers (140 nmi)
- Inclination: 32.5 degrees
- Period: 88.63 minutes
- Epoch: May 24, 1962
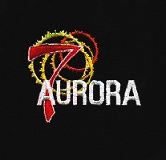
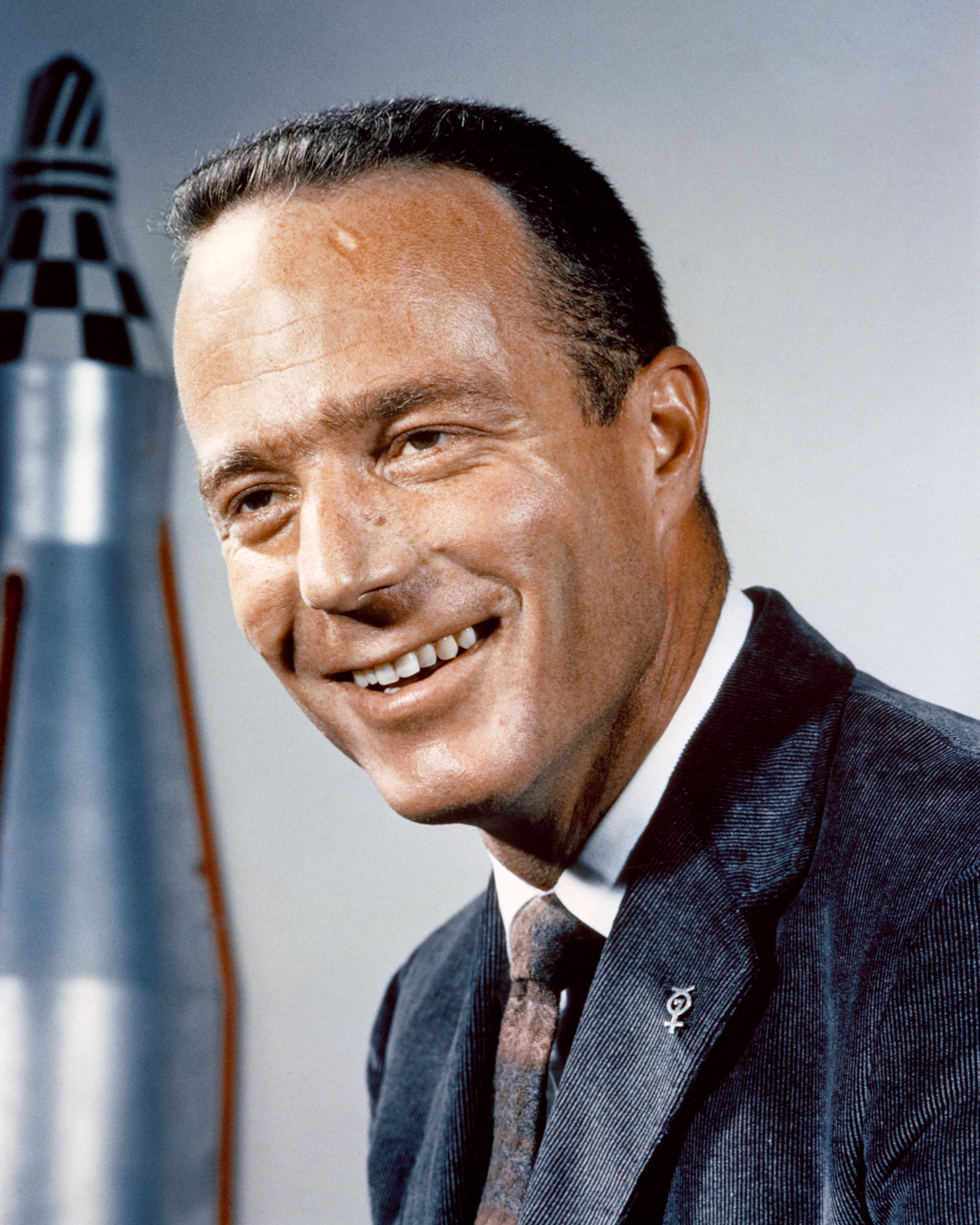
- Spacecraft name as painted on the capsule side Malcolm Scott Carpenter Project Mercury; Crewed missions

Mercury-Atlas 7, launched May 24, 1962, was the fourth crewed flight of Project Mercury. The spacecraft, named Aurora 7, was piloted by astronaut Scott Carpenter. He was the sixth human to fly in space. The mission used Mercury spacecraft No. 18 and Atlas launch vehicle No. 107-D.

The flight was for three Earth orbits, essentially a repeat of John Glenn's Mercury-Atlas 6. However, a targeting error during reentry took the spacecraft 250 miles (400 km) off-course, delaying recovery of Carpenter and the spacecraft for an hour. Carpenter was held responsible, at least in part, for the landing error. Carpenter left NASA for the Navy SEALAB program in 1964.

== Pilot ==
The original pilot selected for Mercury Atlas-7 was to have been Deke Slayton, with Wally Schirra as his backup. However Slayton was removed from flight status after the discovery of idiopathic paroxysmal atrial fibrillation during a training run in the g-loading centrifuge. Slayton had chosen the name Delta 7 for the spacecraft, as this would have been the fourth crewed flight and Delta (Δ) is the fourth letter in the Greek alphabet. Instead of using Schirra, who was backup, it was decided to give the mission to Carpenter, who was the backup crew for Mercury-Atlas 6, had trained with John Glenn, and was considered the best-prepared astronaut. When Carpenter was given the mission, he renamed it Aurora 7 for the open sky and the dawn, symbolizing the dawn of the new age. The number Seven was also chosen for the Mercury 7 astronauts. In addition, Carpenter's home address in his childhood was the corner of Aurora Ave. and Seventh St. in Boulder, Colorado, although at a talk he gave at the Boulder Theater in 2003, Carpenter admitted that he never made the connection between the Aurora 7 spacecraft and the address of his youth until friends pointed it out to him after he made the flight.

== Mission parameters ==
- Mass: 2975 lb (1350 kg)
- Perigee: 96 mi (154 km)
- Apogee: 162 mi (260 km)
- Eccentricity: 0.00804
- Inclination: 32.5°
- Period: 88.3 min
- Fuel:
  - 35 pounds (16 kg) for the automatic system
  - 24.9 pounds (11.3 kg) for the manual system

== Mission highlights ==
=== Preparation ===
Mercury spacecraft No. 18 was delivered to Cape Canaveral, Florida on November 15, 1961. While under checkout, the crew changed the periscope and also worked on the drogue parachute to prevent it from firing prematurely as had happened during the previous flight. In addition, a device known as a "low-level commutator" was added, to measure the temperature around the capsule, recording temperature data from 28 positions on the spacecraft.

Atlas vehicle 107D was rolled out of the Convair factory in San Diego, California on February 25, 1962. It was delivered to Cape Canaveral on March 6.

Changes made to Atlas 107D over Glenn's booster were minor. It had been agreed that the insulation blanket in the tank bulkhead was unnecessary and would be removed on subsequent Mercury-Atlas vehicles, although MA-7 would still retain it. The LOX tank skin was thickened still further due to the growing weight of the Mercury capsule as missions grew longer and more ambitious. A meeting of the Flight Safety Review Board on May 16 discussed the 12 Atlas flights since Glenn's launch and any anomalies on them that were of concern. There had been four major Atlas in-flight malfunctions during this stretch, but three were caused by random quality control defects unlikely to be a concern in the much more tightly supervised Mercury program. More concerning was Atlas 11F, which had exploded almost immediately at liftoff on April 9 and the static firing test of Atlas 1F, which exploded at Sycamore Canyon on May 13. The cause of these two mishaps was as yet unclear, but assumed to be the result of rough combustion, an old problem that had destroyed several previous Atlas vehicles. NASA ultimately decided a rough combustion failure was unlikely to be a concern as Mercury-Atlas vehicles had a three-second hold down prior to launcher release and a different engine start sequence than the Atlas F (as it turned out, the failures on 11F and 1F had an entirely different cause). The explosion of the first Atlas-Centaur shortly after liftoff on May 8 was also a momentary source of concern until postflight analysis found that the Centaur and not the Atlas had been at fault. The temperature sensor installation and the correction of the drogue parachute circuit delayed the launch until May.

Aurora 7 (1962) Official NASA flight mission film reel.

A network of ground stations and ships, called the "Mercury network" was arranged around the globe to provide continuous coverage of the spacecraft. On Mercury-Atlas 7, the network consisted of 15 Mercury sites supplemented by several Atlantic Missile Range (AMR) stations, and the Goddard Space Flight Center. CAPCOMs were operating from different stations around the world to communicate with Carpenter. Gus Grissom was the CAPCOM at Cape Canaveral. Alan Shepard was the CAPCOM at California.

In selecting a wristwatch for his flight, Scott Carpenter tasked Breitling with incorporating a 24-hour dial instead of the normal 12-hour dial, due to lack of day and night in space travel. Breitling produced the 24-hour Navitimer, which Carpenter wore on his 1962 space flight. The watch incorporated a slide rule on the bezel that Carpenter requested be made wider so that the slide rule could be used by an astronaut wearing thick gloves.

The Aurora insignia and subsequent "nose art" was designed and painted by Cece Bibby.

=== During flight ===
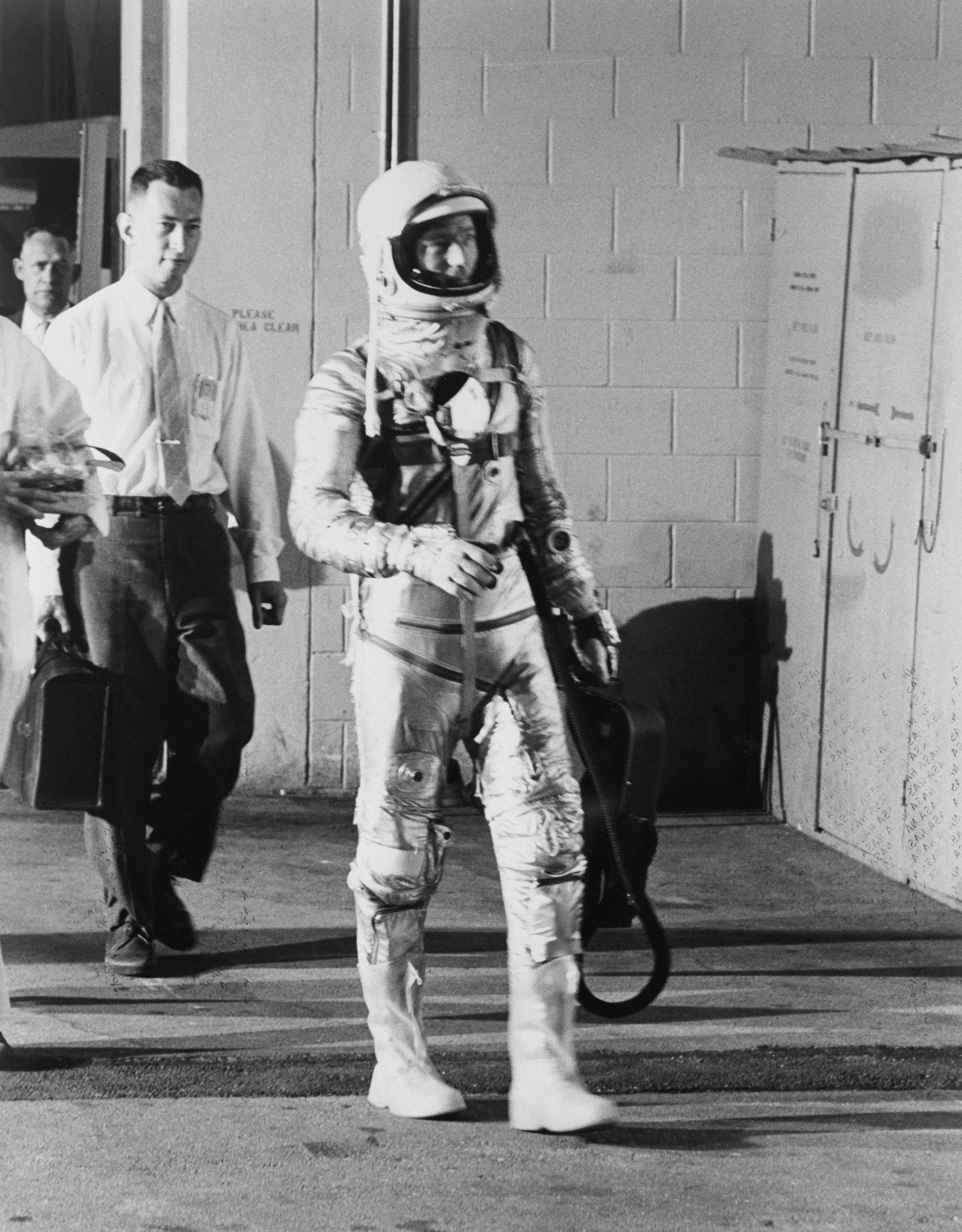
Astronaut Scott Carpenter leaving the White Room for the launch site to begin his Mercury-Atlas 7 (MA-7) mission.

Carpenter was awakened at 1:15 AM on the morning of the flight and ate a breakfast of orange juice, filet mignon, eggs, toast, and coffee. Prior to insertion in the capsule, he was administered a hydration regimen of water, juice, coffee, and sweet tea. He ascended into the gantry at 4:36 AM, and entered the spacecraft at 4:43 AM. Unlike Mercury-Atlas 6, there was no problem with the sealing bolts.

Launch occurred at 7:45 a.m. EST on May 24, 1962.

Launch vehicle performance was overall excellent with one small anomaly in that one of the sustainer engine's hydraulic switches registered a loss of sustainer hydraulic pressure and moved to the abort position at T+265 seconds. Normal hydraulic system performance was substantiated by other flight data and as two hydraulic switches had to be tripped to signal an abort to the ASIS system, nothing happened and the flight proceeded as planned. The malfunction of the hydraulic switch was believed to be the result of cold temperatures due to nearby LOX lines; on subsequent flights thermal insulation would be added to prevent a recurrence. BECO was effected at T+124 seconds and SECO at T+305 seconds. The Atlas's flight path was so accurate that Aurora 7 reached almost the exact orbital parameters planned for the mission.

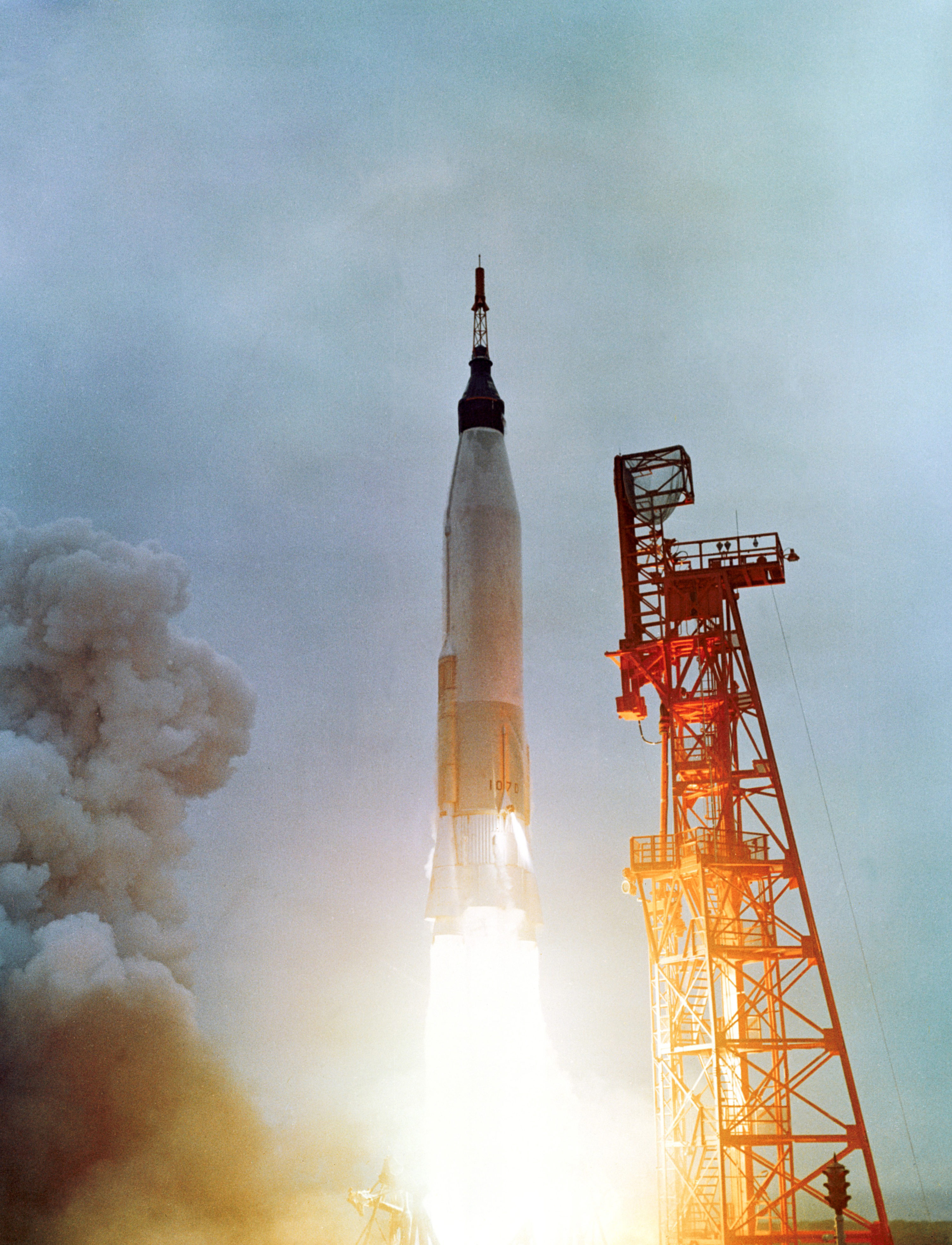
MA-7 launch

Carpenter had solid food items for the first time, in the form of freeze-dried cubes in a plastic bag, instead of paste squeezed out of a tube, which produced problems with loose crumbs floating inside the cabin. The food cubes had been coated with an anti-crumbling agent, but may have accidentally been crushed prior to launch, breaking the coating. Carpenter expressed concern about crumbs being sucked into ventilation intakes in the capsule in addition to posing a possible choking hazard if ingested. In addition, a candy bar included in the food supply melted from high cabin temperatures (up to 102 °F). By the end of the second orbit, he informed Mercury Control that most of the food was a mess and he would avoid touching it for the rest of the flight aside from taking a xylose capsule.

With each orbital sunrise, Carpenter also saw the "fireflies", though he observed them to be more like snowflakes. He also noted that the particles did not seem to be truly luminous, and varied in size, brightness, and color. Some were gray, some were white, and one in particular, said Carpenter, looked like a helical shaving from a lathe. Although they seemed to travel at different speeds, they did not move out and away from the spacecraft as the confetti had in the balloon experiment.

Carpenter also took 19 photos of the flattened Sun at orbit sunset.

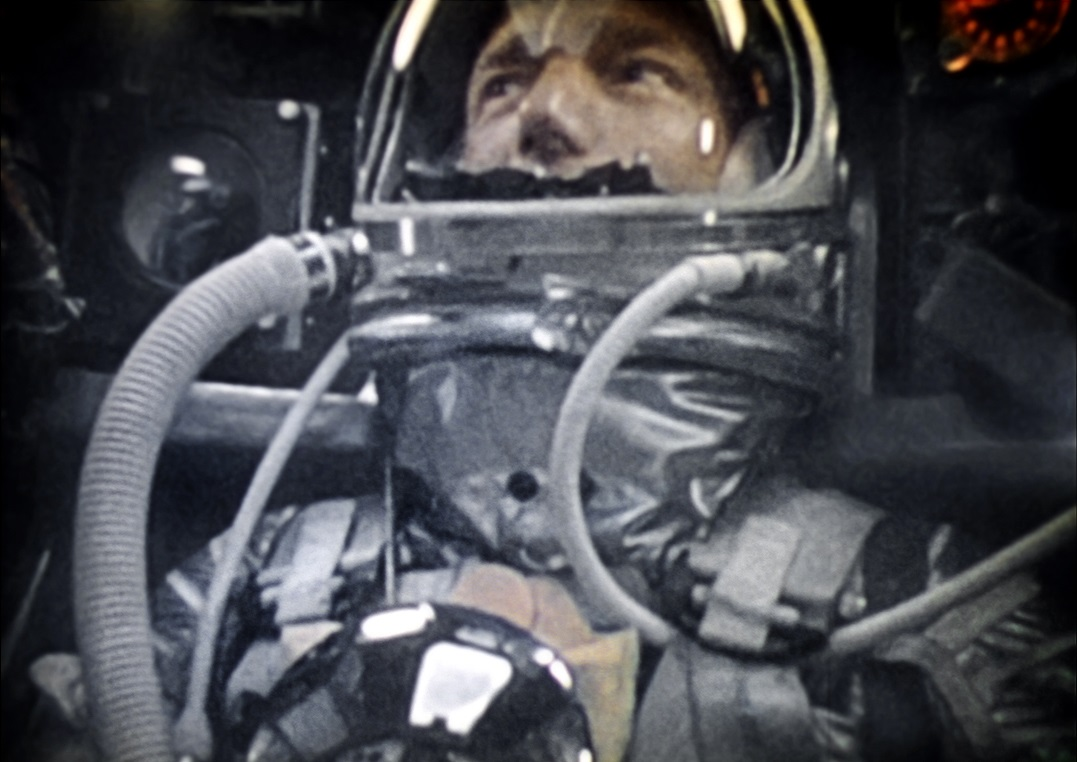
Astronaut Scott Carpenter during Mercury-Atlas 7 mission

At dawn of the third and final orbit, Carpenter inadvertently bumped his hand against the inside wall of the cabin and solved a mystery from the previous flight. The resulting bright shower of particles outside the spacecraft—what John Glenn had called "fireflies"—turned out to be ice particles shaken loose from the spacecraft's exterior. Near the end of the flight, Carpenter found that by banging his hand against the wall of the capsule, he could shake more "fireflies" loose. At first, it was thought that the particles could be marker dye or shark repellent, both green-colored, however, testing confirmed that neither of those were likely to escape from their packages in zero gravity.

It was then suspected that the fireflies were either steam from the life support system turning into ice crystals when exposed to open space or debris on the exterior of the spacecraft being shaken loose, however, the former was considered the more probable explanation. Steam generated by the life support system formed condensation between the spacecraft bulkhead and the heat shield which then escaped into space and froze.

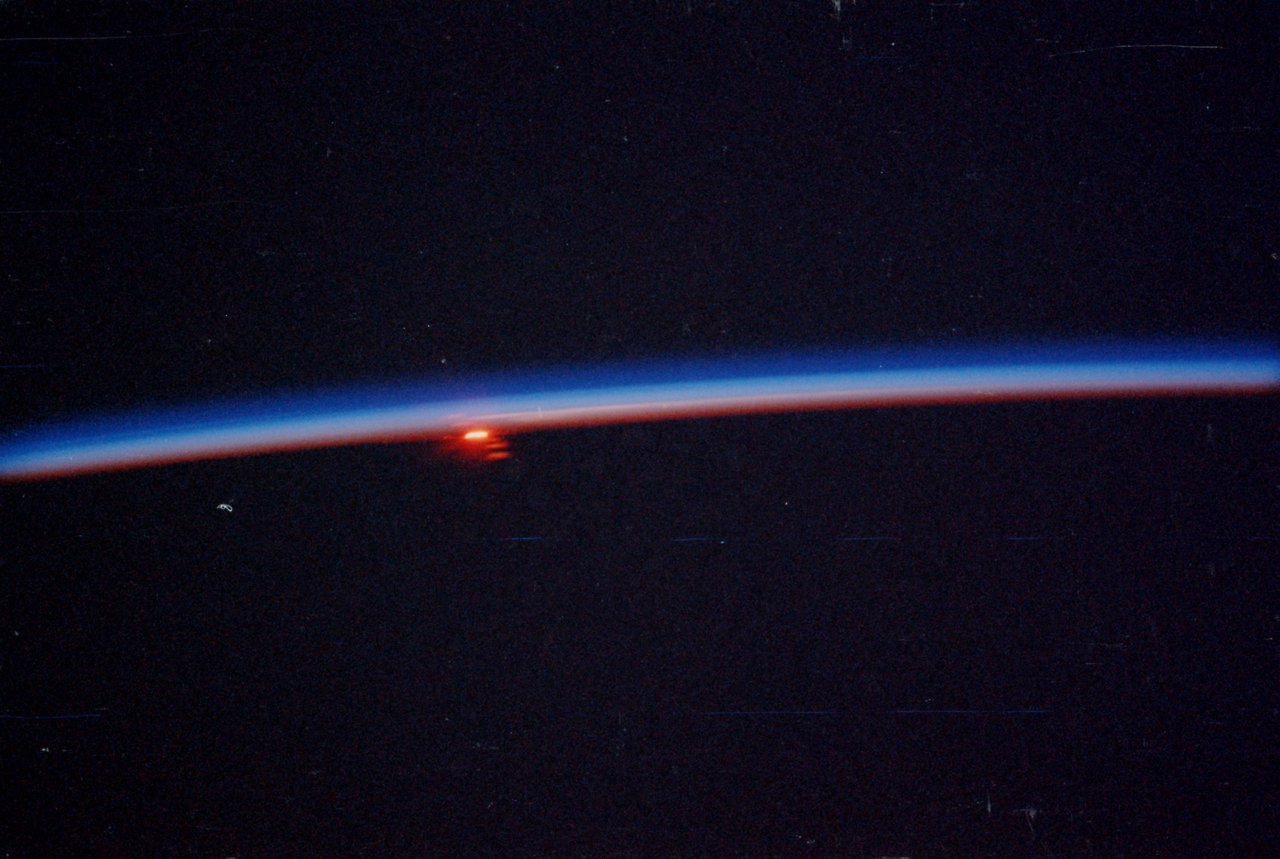
Earth horizon photo by Carpenter on-board Aurora 7

Like Glenn, Carpenter circled the Earth three times, with the total time spent weightless at 4 hours, 39 minutes, and 32 seconds. The performance of the Mercury spacecraft and Atlas launch vehicle was excellent in nearly every respect. All primary mission objectives were achieved. The single mission-critical malfunction which occurred involved a failure in the spacecraft pitch horizon scanner, a component of the automatic control system. This anomaly was adequately compensated for by the pilot in subsequent in-flight operations so that the success of the mission was not compromised. A modification of the spacecraft control-system thrust units was effective. Cabin and pressure-suit temperatures were high but not intolerable. Some uncertainties in the data telemetered from the bioinstrumentation prevailed at times during the flight; however, associated information was available which indicated continued well-being of the astronaut.

Carpenter was unable to spot many landmarks due to heavy cloud cover across much of the orbital path. The Southwestern US and Western Africa were clear and he could not see Florida at all.

Equipment was included in the spacecraft which provided valuable scientific information—notably that regarding liquid behavior in a weightless state, identification of the airglow layer observed by Glenn, and photography of terrestrial features and meteorological phenomena. An experiment which was to provide atmospheric drag and color visibility data in space through the deployment of an inflatable sphere was partially successful. The flight further qualified the Mercury spacecraft systems for crewed orbital operations and provided evidence for progressing into missions of extended duration and consequently more demanding systems requirements.

=== Scientific experiments ===
The focus of Carpenter's five-hour mission was scientific. The full flight plan included the first study of liquids in weightlessness, Earth photography, and an unsuccessful attempt to observe a flare fired from the ground.

One of the experiments would include releasing a multi-colored balloon that would remain tethered to the capsule, observing the behavior of liquid in a weightless state inside a closed glass bottle, using a special light meter to determine the visibility of a ground flare, making weather photographs with hand-held cameras, and studying the airglow layer - for which Carpenter would receive special training. The tethered balloon was a 30-inch (760 mm) mylar inflatable sphere, which was folded, packaged, and housed with its gas expansion bottle in the antenna canister. The whole balloon package weighed two pounds. Divided into five sections of different colors - uncolored aluminum, yellow, orange, white, and a phosphorescent coating that appeared white by day and blue by night - the balloon was to be cast off near perigee after the first orbital pass to float freely at the end of a 100-foot (30 m) nylon line. The purposes of the balloon experiment were to study the effects of space on the reflection properties of colored surfaces through visual observation and photographic studies and to obtain aerodynamic drag measurements by use of a strain gauge.

=== Landing ===
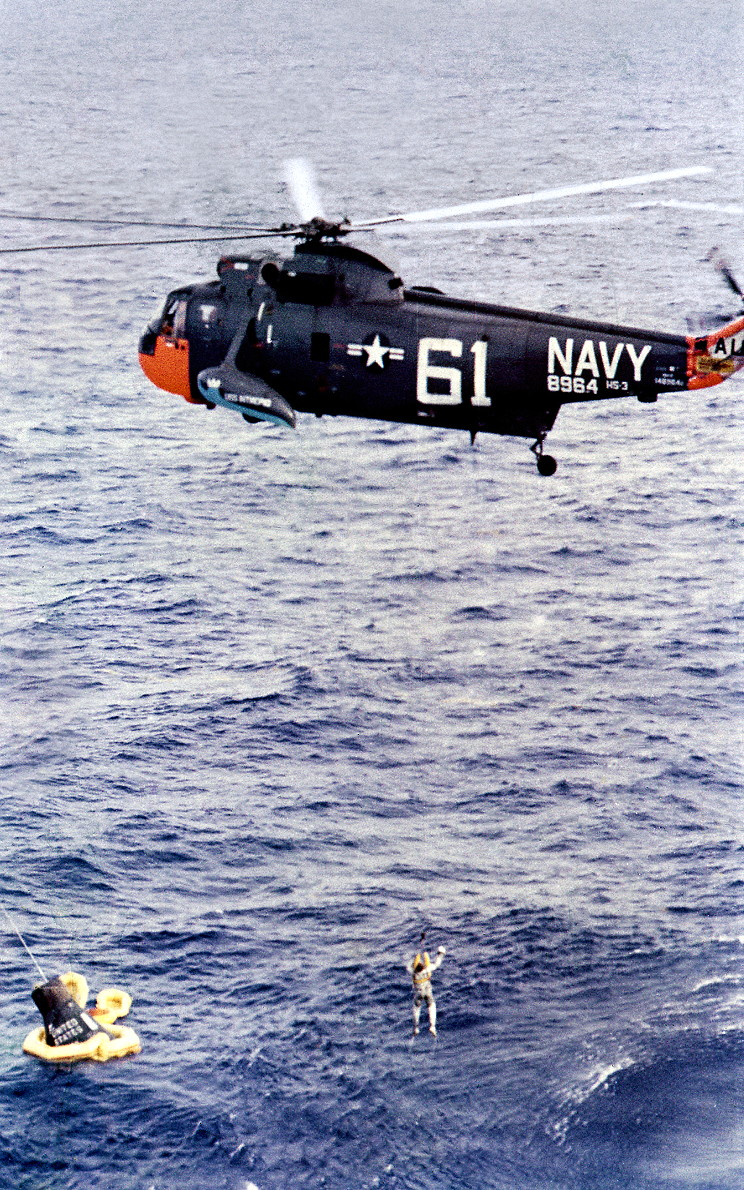
Aurora 7 recovery

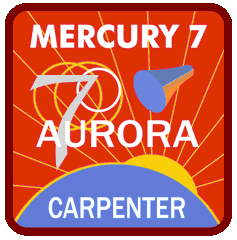
Mission insignia

As Carpenter passed over Hawaii during the final orbit, flight director Chris Kraft told him to begin his retrofire countdown and to shift from manual control to the automatic attitude control. Partly because he had been distracted watching the fireflies, Carpenter noted that he had begun his landing preparations late. As he started to align the spacecraft he found that the automatic stabilization system would not hold the required 34-degree pitch and zero-degree yaw attitude. While trying to determine the source of the trouble, he fell behind in his check of other items. When he switched to the fly-by-wire control mode, he forgot to switch off the manual system. As a result, both systems were used together for 10 minutes, and fuel was wasted.

Noting a disagreement between his attitude indicators and what he could see from the window and the periscope, Carpenter established retrofire attitude visually; Aurora 7 was in fact aimed 25 degrees right of the true retrograde vector. In addition to the attitude error, Carpenter also activated the retrorockets three seconds late, adding another 15 miles (24 km) or so to the trajectory error. Following retro jettison, Aurora 7's fuel gauges indicated 20% in the automatic tank and 5% in the manual tank. Carpenter intended to use his remaining manual fuel to establish reentry attitude, but found that the gauge was inaccurate and the manual tank was actually empty. Due to compounding issues and lack of fuel, Carpenter overshot his planned reentry mark and splashed down 250 miles (400 km) from the target.

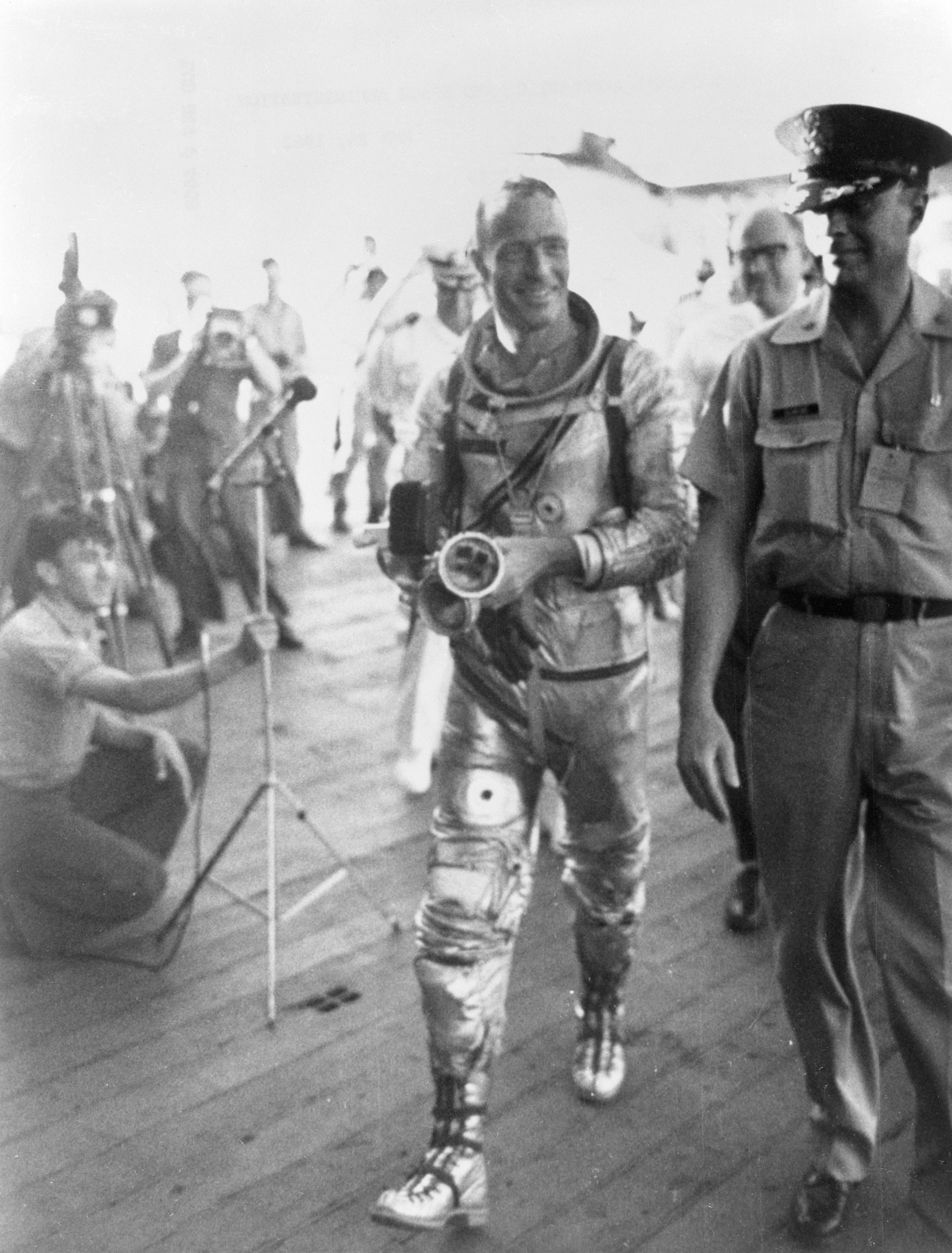
Scott Carpenter is received on board USS Intrepid

After nearly an hour of searching, Carpenter was located in an area northeast of Puerto Rico. USS Farragut was the first ship to arrive at the spacecraft nearly forty minutes after splashdown had occurred. Two helicopters dispatched from the aircraft carrier USS Intrepid reached the scene and transported Carpenter back to Intrepid and over the next several hours Farragut remained on the scene watching the spacecraft until USS John R. Pierce arrived with special equipment enabling her to tow Aurora 7 to Roosevelt Roads Puerto Rico where it was then flown back to Cape Canaveral.

Other than slight exhaustion, Carpenter was in good health and spirits and post-flight medical exams did not find any significant physical changes or anomalies. Kraft, however, was unhappy with the astronaut's performance due to his needlessly high expenditure of attitude control fuel, which resulted in reentry and landing taking place well off-course. As a result, Carpenter was sidelined for future missions. He left the space program in 1964 to participate in the Navy's SEALAB program. Aurora 7 is displayed at the Kenneth C. Griffin Museum of Science and Industry in Chicago, Illinois.

== Mercury-Atlas three-orbit flight events ==
T+ Time	Event	Description
T+00:00:00	Liftoff	Mercury-Atlas lifts off, onboard clock starts.
T+00:00:02	Roll Program	Mercury-Atlas rotates along its axis 2.5 deg/s from 30° to 0°.
T+00:00:16	Pitch Program	Mercury-Atlas begins a 0.5 deg/s pitch from 90° to 0°.
T+00:00:30	Radio Guidance Lock	General Electric-Burroughs guidance system locks onto radio transponder in Atlas booster to guide the vehicle until orbit insertion.
T+00:01:24	Max Q	Maximum dynamic pressure ~980 lbf/ft² (47 kPa)
T+00:02:10	BECO	Atlas Booster Engine Cutoff. Booster engines drop away.
T+00:02:33	Tower Jettison	Escape Tower Jettison, no longer needed.
T+00:02:25	Atlas Pitchover	After tower separation, vehicle pitches over further.
T+00:05:20	SECO	Atlas Sustainer Engine Cutoff, spacecraft reaches orbit, velocity 17,547 mph (7,844 m/s).
T+00:05:24	Spacecraft Separation	Posigrade rockets fire for 1 second giving 15 ft/s (5 m/s) separation.
T+00:05:25	5-Second Rate Damping	ASCS damps spacecraft rates for 5 seconds in preparation for turnaround maneuver.
T+00:05:25	Turnaround Maneuver	Spacecraft (ASCS) system rotates spacecraft 180 degrees, to heat shield forward attitude. Nose is pitched down 34 degrees to retro fire position.
T+00:05:30; T+04:30:00	Orbital Operations	Orbital operations and experiments for 3 orbits.
T+04:30:00	Retro Sequence Start	Retrofire in 30 s; (ASCS) checks for proper retro attitude −34° pitch, 0° yaw, 0° roll.
T+04:30:30	Retrofire	Three retro rockets fire for 10 seconds each. They are started at 5 second intervals, firing overlaps for a total of 20 seconds. Delta V of 550 ft/s (168 m/s) is taken off forward velocity.
T+04:31:00	Retract Periscope	Periscope is automatically retracted in preparation for reentry.
T+04:31:50	Retro Pack Jettison	One minute after retrofire retro pack is jettisoned, leaving heatshield clear.
T+04:33:00	Retro Attitude Maneuver	(ASCS) orients spacecraft in 34° nose down pitch, 0° roll, 0° yaw.
T+04:40:30	0.05 G Maneuver	(ASCS) detects beginning of reentry and rolls spacecraft at 10 degrees per second to stabilize spacecraft during reentry.
T+04:50:20	Drogue Parachute Deploy	Drogue parachute deployed at 22,000 ft (6.7 km) slowing descent to 365 ft/s (111 m/s) and stabilizing spacecraft.
T+04:50:25	Snorkel Deploy	Fresh air snorkel deploys at 20,000 ft (6 km). ECS switches to emergency oxygen rate to cool cabin.
T+04:51:55	Main Parachute Deploy	Main parachute deploys at 10,000 ft (3 km). Descent rate slows to 30 ft/s (9 m/s).
T+04:52:00	Landing Bag Deploy	Landing Bag Deploys, dropping heat shield down four feet (1.2 m).
T+04:52:30	Fuel Dump	Remaining hydrogen peroxide fuel automatically dumped.
T+04:57:10	Splashdown	Spacecraft lands in water.
T+04:57:10	Rescue Aids Deploy	Rescue aid package deployed. The package includes green dye marker, recovery radio beacon, and whip antenna.

== See also ==
- Splashdown
