= Masonic Home for Children =

- U.S. National Register of Historic Places
- Location within Louisiana Location within the United States
- Location: 5800 Masonic Dr., Alexandria, Louisiana
- Coordinates: 31°15′34″N 92°28′41″W
- Area: 5 acres (2.0 ha)
- Built: 1924
- Architect: Jones, Roessle, Olschner & Wiener
- Architectural style: Classical Revival, Renaissance, Italian Renaissance
- NRHP reference No.: 87002038
- Added to NRHP: November 20, 1987

Masonic Home for Children is located in Alexandria, Louisiana, United States. It was built in 1925 by Louisiana Masons and added to the National Register of Historic Places on November 20, 1987. The home was closed in 1994 and the 70-acre site remained vacant. In 2012, some of the buildings were partially torn down to be turned into an upscale apartment complex.
