= 38th Signal Battalion =

- 38th Signal Battalion Coat of Arms
- Active: 1942–1946 1986–1991
- Disbanded: 1991
- Country: United States
- Branch: United States Army
- Type: Signal
- Motto: Signal Ready
- Decorations: Superior Unit Award

Insignia
- Distinctive unit insignia

The 38th Signal Battalion was a unit of the United States Army. It was last active from 17 January 1986 to 15 June 1991.

== Coat of arms ==
Shield: Tenné, three lightning flashes—two per saltire and one per pale argent—centered overall a sinister gauntlet sable.

Crest: On a wreath of the colors argent and tenné a demi-globe of the like gridlined argent surmounted by a mullet, points fleury or.

Symbolism: Orange and white are the colors traditionally associated with the Signal Corps. The three lightning flashes symbolize command, control, and communication. The gauntlet represents strength and unity. The orange demi-globe represents the unit’s involvement in worldwide communications. The gold five-pointed star denotes the five campaign participation credits awarded the unit for service in France and Central Europe, as represented by the fleurs-de-lis.

Distinctive Unit Insignia: The distinctive unit insignia is the shield and motto of the coat of arms. It was designed, in 1986, by SPC Anita Yellowhair Sonne, the Signal Battalion's resident artist.

== History ==
The 38th Signal Construction Battalion was organized on 11 May 1942. On 6 October 1942 it became affiliated with the New York Telephone Company. The battalion move to Camp Toccoa, Georgia, on 1 July 1943 and affiliation with NYT was terminated.

The battalion reorganized and redesignated on 19 May 1945 as the 38th Signal Light Construction Battalion. The unit then left Europe on 7 July 1945 on the USS General H. W. Butner (AP-113) and arrived in Okinawa on 1 September 1945. The battalion was inactivated 30 January 1946 on Okinawa.

=== Pershing ===
The 56th Field Artillery Command reorganized on 17 January 1986. The communications sections in all of the subordinate field artillery battalions were consolidated into the reactivated 38th Signal Battalion.

==== Subordinate units ====
- Headquarters and Headquarters Company (HHC) in Schwäbisch Gmünd
- A Company supporting Headquarters, 56th Field Artillery Command in Schwäbisch Gmünd
- B Company supporting 1st Battalion, 9th Field Artillery Regiment in Neu-Ulm
- C Company supporting 4th Battalion, 9th Field Artillery Regiment in Heilbronn
- D Company supporting 2nd Battalion, 9th Field Artillery Battalion in Schwäbisch Gmünd

The battalion provided communication links for the command and control of the Pershing missile in garrison, during field operations and at Combat Alert Status sites. Communications equipment included the AN/TRC-184 radio terminal set and the AN/MSC-64 satellite communications terminal.

The battalion was deactivated 15 June 1991 when the 56th Field Artillery Command was deactivated.

== Campaigns ==
- World War II
  - Normandy
  - Northern France
  - Rhineland
  - Ardennes-Alsace
  - Central Europe
  - Asiatic-Pacific Theater, Streamer without inscription

== Decorations ==
- Army Superior Unit Award (January 1986 – December 1986)
