= 55th Support Battalion =

- Distinctive unit insignia
- Active: 1982–1991
- Disbanded: 1991
- Branch: U.S Army
- Type: Quartermaster (1943–1946); Transportation (1946–1970); Ordnance (1982–1986); Quartermaster (1986–1991)
- Motto: Complete Support
- Decorations: Meritorious Unit Commendation (four awards) Republic of Korea Presidential Unit Citation Superior Unit Award

The 55th Support Battalion was a unit of the United States Army, which was last active from 9 July 1982 to 15 June 1991.

== Heraldry ==
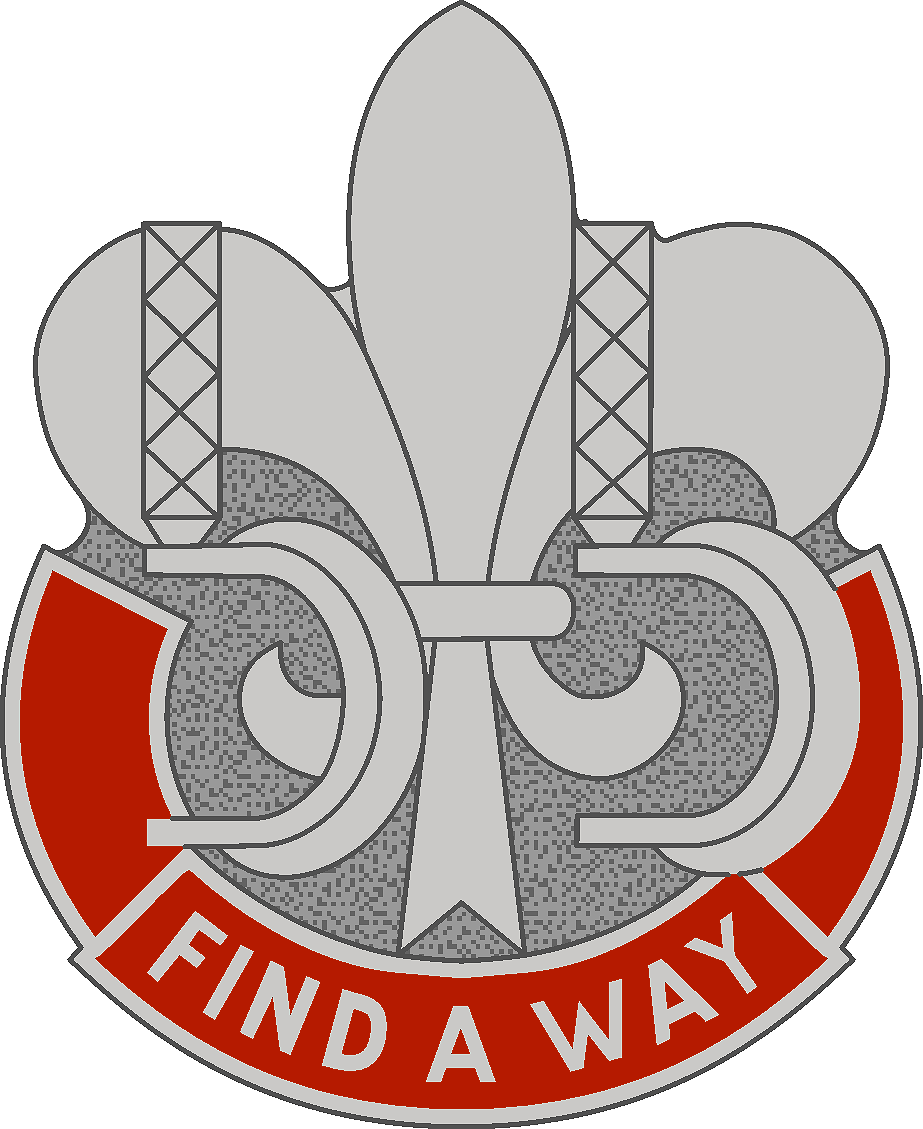
Distinctive unit insignia 1968

Distinctive unit insignia: When the 55th Maintenance Battalion was reactivated in 1982, a new distinctive unit insignia was created.

Crimson and blue indicate former designation as the 55th Maintenance Battalion. Five decorations for overseas service are represented by the gold wavy bend. The bend also symbolizes hydraulics. The gear refers to mechanics and the flash to electronics. The spearhead is symbolic of the Pershing support mission of the unit.

Motto: "Complete Support"

Previous insignia: The older DUI was used from 1968 until the battalion was deactivated in 1970.

== History ==
=== World War II ===
The battalion was constituted as the 55th Quartermaster Truck Battalion on 28 May 1943. On 7 July 1943, it was consolidated with the 2639th Quartermaster Truck Battalion, which was activated at Canastel, Algeria on 13 March 1943. After the consolidation, the unit was redesignated the 55th Quartermaster Truck Battalion. The need for trucks in North Africa greatly exceeded what was planned. The battalion was made up of volunteers from other units already serving in North Africa. This was unusual since most Quartermaster units were organized as regiments with three battalions each. The 53rd, 54th and 55th Battalions were the first truck units organized as battalions. Each truck battalion had four companies, but on 19 December 1943, the battalions were broken up, reorganized and redesignated. The four companies A through D became the 3357 through 3360th Quartermaster Truck Companies and the battalion became Headquarters and Headquarters Detachment, 55th Quartermaster Battalion, Mobile. The 55th Battalion was inactivated at Camp Kilmer, New Jersey, on 24 March 1946.

=== Korean War ===
The War Department directed that the Quartermaster turn over its truck units to the Transportation Corps effective 1 August 1946. Consequently, the 55th was converted and redesignated as HHD, 55th Transportation Corps Truck Battalion on 1 August 1946 and activated at Fort Knox, Kentucky, the same day. It was then inactivated at Fort Knox on 12 April 1948. The 55th was reactivated at Fort Eustis, Virginia, on 4 October 1948. It was redesignated as the HHD, 55th Transportation Truck Battalion on 3 June 1949.

In 1951, the 55th had the following companies attached to it:

- 74th Transportation Truck Company
- 107th Transportation Truck Company
- 252nd Transportation Truck Company
- 505th Transportation Truck Company
- 540th Transportation Truck Company
- 665th Transportation Truck Company
- 715th Transportation Truck Company

In November 1951, the battalion had the following companies:

- 74th Transportation Truck Company
- 505th Transportation Truck Company
- 514th Transportation Truck Company
- 541st Transportation Truck Company
- 584th Transportation Truck Company
- 665th Transportation Truck Company

The 55th Battalion was inactivated in Japan on 25 March 1956. While on inactive status it was redesignated as HHD, 55th Transportation Battalion on 22 June 1960. It was then reactivated in Korea on 24 June 1960. It was converted and redesignated as Headquarters and Company A, 55th Maintenance Battalion. Organic elements were concurrently organized by conversion and redesignation of existing units. It was inactivated in Korea on 1 May 1970.

=== Pershing ===
The 55th Maintenance Battalion was reformed 20 June 1981 and activated 9 July 1982 as part of the 56th Field Artillery Brigade, supporting the Pershing missile system in West Germany. The 579th Ordnance Company was deactivated and reformed as Headquarters and Headquarters Company (HHC) and D Company (General Support) in Neu-Ulm, West Germany.

The 56th Field Artillery Brigade had three field artillery battalions, each with a service battery. The service batteries were deactivated with the automotive, engineer, signal, and missile maintenance platoons reformed as forward support companies under the 55th Maintenance Battalion. The ammunition and security platoons from the service batteries were merged into the headquarters and headquarters batteries which were redesignated as the headquarters, headquarters and service battery (HHSB). The brigade aviation assets were formed into E Company.

The battalion provided logistical support for the 56th Field Artillery Brigade, including missile, engineer, communications and automotive, coordinated by the Material Management Center.

On 17 January 1986, the 56th Field Artillery Brigade reorganized as the 56th Field Artillery Command. The 55th Maintenance Battalion was redesignated the 55th Support Battalion and E Company was deactivated and reformed as the 193rd Aviation Company.

The battalion was deactivated 15 June 1991 when the 56th Field Artillery Command was deactivated.

==== Subordinate units ====
- Headquarters and Headquarters Company (HHC) at Nelson Barracks in Neu-Ulm
- A Company (Forward Support) supporting 1st Battalion, 41st Field Artillery Regiment, later 2nd Battalion, 9th Field Artillery Regiment at Hardt Kaserne in Schwäbisch Gmünd
- B Company (Forward Support) supporting 1st Battalion, 81st Field Artillery Regiment, later 1st Battalion, 9th Field Artillery Regiment at Wiley Barracks in Neu-Ulm
- C Company (Forward Support) supporting 3rd Battalion, 84th Field Artillery Regiment, later 4th Battalion, 9th Field Artillery Regiment at Artillery Kaserne in Neckarsulm
- D Company (General Support) at Nelson Barracks in Neu-Ulm
- E Company (Aviation) in Mutlangen, later moved to Cooke Barracks in Göppingen

==== Commanders ====
- Lt. Col. William S. Littlefield (1980–1883)
- Lt. Col. Robert J. Hueffed (24 June 1983 – May 1985)
- Lt. Col. Joseph W. Arbuckle (May 1985 – 1986)
- Lt. Col. Richard A. Carter (1986–)

== Campaigns ==
=== World War II ===
- Tunisia
- Sicily
- Naples-Foggia
- Rome-Arno
- Southern France
- Rhineland
- Ardennes-Alsace
- Central Europe
- Anzio
- North Apennines
- Po Valley
- Philippine Islands

=== Korean War ===
- UN Defensive
- UN Offensive
- CCF Intervention
- First UN Counteroffensive
- CCF Spring Offensive
- UN Summer–Fall Offensive
- Second Winter
- Summer–Fall 1952
- Third Winter
- Summer 1953

== Decorations ==
- Meritorious Unit Commendation, Streamer embroidered EUROPEAN THEATER
- Meritorious Unit Commendation, Streamer embroidered KOREA 1950–1951
- Meritorious Unit Commendation, Streamer embroidered KOREA 1952
- Meritorious Unit Commendation, Streamer embroidered KOREA 1953
- Republic of Korea Presidential Unit Citation, Streamer embroidered KOREA.
- Army Superior Unit Award (November 1983 – December 1986)

== Notable members ==
- Patricia E. McQuistion, commander of C Company, 55th Maintenance Battalion
