= Pershing Operational Test Unit =

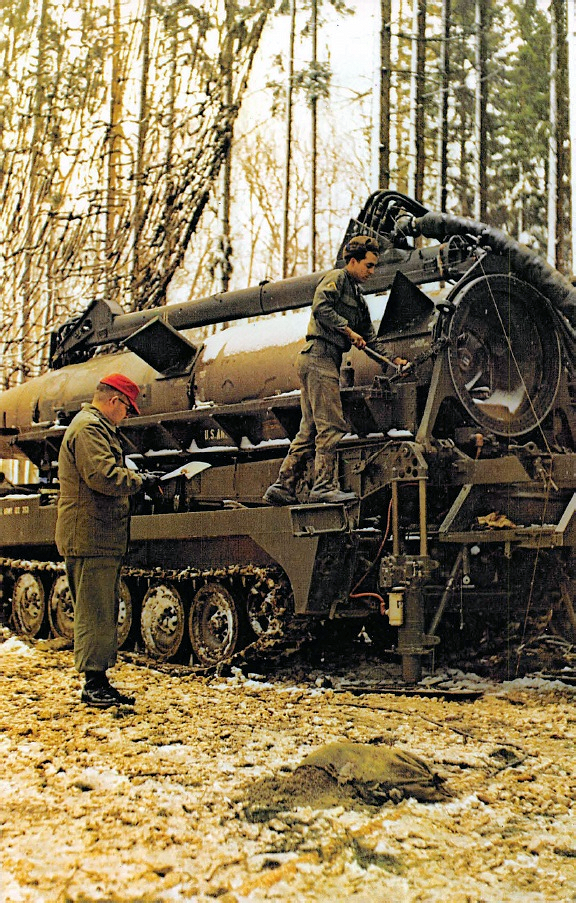
Pershing troops undergo a combat readiness check at a firing site in West Germany while being observed by a member of POTU (c. 1967)

The Pershing Operational Test Unit (POTU) was the U.S. Army agency responsible for the operational testing of the Pershing 1 Field Artillery Missile System, the Pershing 1a Field Artillery Missile System and the Pershing II Weapon System. Created in 1965, POTU was assigned to United States Army Europe and located in Heidelberg, Germany. Personnel consisted of one lieutenant colonel, two majors, one captain, two warrant officers and four non-commissioned officers.

In 1965, the Army contracted with the Applied Physics Laboratory (APL) of Johns Hopkins University to develop and implement a test and evaluation program. APL developed the Pershing Operational Test Program (OTP), provided technical support to the Pershing Operational Test Unit (POTU), identified problem areas and improved the performance and survivability of the Pershing systems.

POTU planned, scheduled, and executed the tests, evaluations, and missile firings to support OTP. POTU would select three firing batteries from the 56th Field Artillery Command in West Germany to participate in Follow-on Operational Tests (FOT) using an unannounced Field Alert Status Verification (FASV) at the Quick Reaction Alert (QRA) site. POTU selected missiles, equipment and personnel (colloquially referred to as a tap) for transport to either Cape Canaveral or White Sands Missile Range. After arrival, the missiles and launchers would be equipped with telemetry and the missiles would have range safety equipment installed for in-flight destruction if needed. Shoots were supported by elements of the 3rd Battalion, 9th Field Artillery Regiment from Fort Sill, Oklahoma. The missile crews would perform tactical countdowns and launch the missile. Data collectors from APL observed the crews and equipment. After the shoot, data and evaluations were compiled into reports of the performance estimates of the operational capabilities of the Pershing missile system. POTU members wore red hats during evaluations, leading to red hat as a nickname.
