= 84th Field Artillery Regiment =

- Coat of arms
- Active: 1917
- Country: United States
- Branch: Army
- Type: Field artillery
- Motto: Performance Above All

Insignia
- Distinctive unit insignia

The 84th Field Artillery Regiment is a field artillery regiment of the United States Army.

== History ==
=== Pershing ===
==== 3rd Battalion, 84th Field Artillery Regiment ====
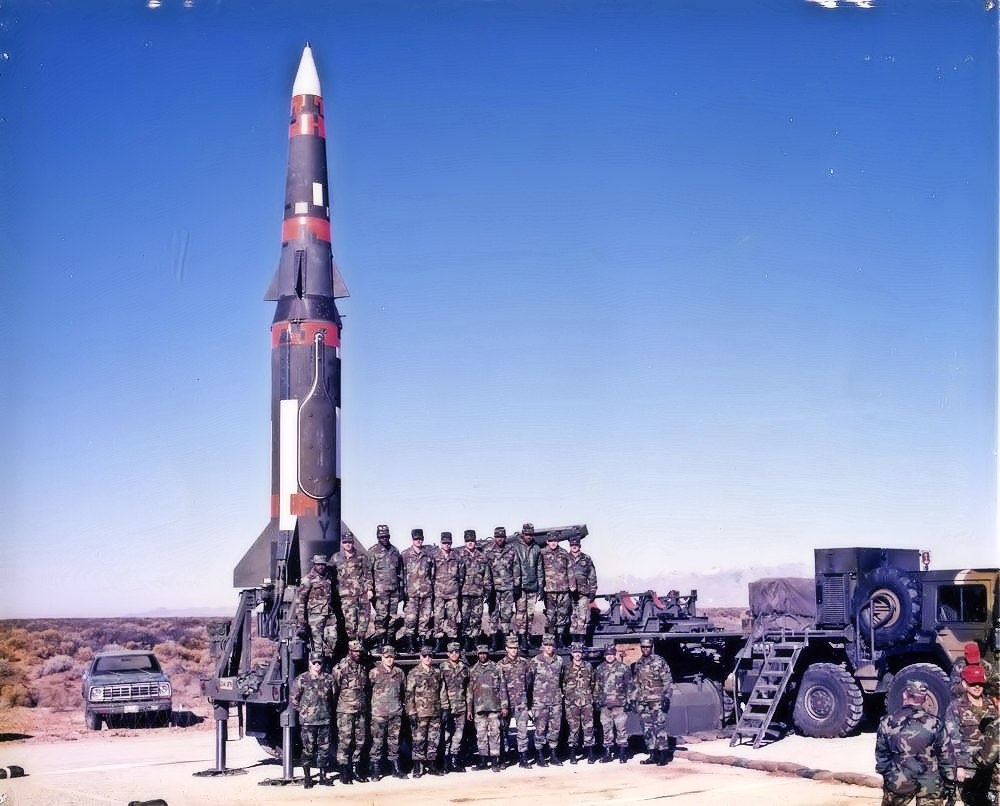
Soldiers of A Battery, 3rd Battalion, 84th Field Artillery Regiment pose with a Pershing 1B missile system at White Sands Missile Range, January 1986. This was an Engineering Development test firing, thus the missile is marked with tracking colors. Note the "Red Hats" on the right, members of the Pershing Operational Test Unit (POTU).

The 3rd Missile Battalion, 84th Artillery Regiment was formed at Fort Sill in 1963 and deployed to Heilbronn, West Germany under the 56th Field Artillery Group. It was initially equipped with four Pershing 1 nuclear missiles, upgraded to six in 1964 and eight in 1965 and in 1969 replaced these with 36 Pershing 1a missiles. The battalion was redesignated as the 3rd Battalion, 84th Field Artillery Regiment in 1968. Service Battery was inactivated and reflagged as C Company, 55th Maintenance Battalion in 1982. The battalion exchanged the Pershing 1a missiles for Pershing II missiles in 1984. The battalion was inactivated in 1986 and reflagged as the 4th Battalion, 9th Field Artillery Regiment.

===== Commanders =====
- 1964: Lt. Col. William Fleshman
- 1967: Lt.Col Horton
- 1971: Lt. Col John E. Donahue
- 1972: Lt. Col. Paul Kieffer
- 1973: Lt. Col. Sam Ady
- 1979: Lt. Col. Ronald P. Forest
- 1982: Lt. Col. James Loftus
- 1985: Lt. Col Hugh Williams

== Lineage ==
- Constituted 16 September 1918 in the National Army as the 84th Field Artillery.
- Partially organized 3 October 1918 at Camp Sheridan, Alabama.
- Demobilized 13 December 1918 at Camp Sheridan, Alabama.
- Reconstituted 17 March 1930 in the Regular Army as the 84th Field Artillery and assigned to the 3d Cavalry Division.

(1st Battalion activated 1 July 1936 at Fort Riley, Kansas.)

- Relieved 30 September 1939 from assignment to the 3d Cavalry Division

(1st Battalion concurrently inactivated at Fort Riley, Kansas).

- Redesignated 1 October 1940 as the 84th Field Artillery Battalion, assigned to the 9th Division (later redesignated as the 9th Infantry Division), and activated at Fort Bragg, North Carolina.
- Inactivated 20 November 1946 in Germany.
- Activated 12 July 1948 at Fort Dix, New Jersey.
- Inactivated 1 December 1957 at Fort Carson, Colorado, and relieved from assignment to the 9th Infantry Division.
- Reorganized and redesignated 31 July 1959 as the 84th Artillery, a parent regiment under the Combat Arms Regimental System. * Redesignated 1 September 1971 as the 84th Field Artillery. Withdrawn 16 June 1986 from the Combat Arms Regimental System and reorganized under the United States Army Regimental System.

== Heraldry ==
=== Distinctive unit insignia ===
Description: A Gold color metal and enamel device 1 1/16 inches (2.7 cm) in height overall consisting of a shield blazoned: Gules, on a saltire Or a winged spur of the first. Attached below the shield a Red scroll inscribed "PERFORMANCE ABOVE ALL" in Gold letters.

Symbolism: The shield is red for Artillery. The saltire is taken from the State flag of Alabama, the birthplace of the Regiment. The winged spur signifies that the unit was mounted.

Background: The distinctive unit insignia was originally approved for the 84th Field Artillery Regiment on 3 December 1936. It was redesignated for the 84th Field Artillery Battalion on 12 November 1940. It was redesignated for the 84th Artillery Regiment on 28 October 1958. The insignia was redesignated effective 1 September 1971, for the 84th Field Artillery Regiment.

=== Coat of arms ===
Shield: Gules, on a saltire Or a winged spur of the first.

Crest: On a wreath of the colors Or and Gules a crescent of the first, a fountain within a chevron raguly Sable overall, and issuant therefrom a fleur-de-lis Gold the outer leaves in base conjoined to the crescent.

Motto: Performance Above All

Symbolism: Shield: The shield is red for Artillery. The saltire is taken from the State flag of Alabama, the birthplace of the Regiment. The winged spur signifies that the unit was mounted. Crest: The two Distinguished Unit Citations awarded the organization during World War II are symbolized by the crescent for French Tunisia and the raguly chevron for the bridgehead at Remagen. The irregular upper edge of the chevron alludes to the attempted destruction of the Ludendorff Bridge by the retreating enemy. The fountain is used to represent the organization's action along the Meuse River; and the fleur-de-lis symbolizes the unit's action in the Ardennes.

Background: The coat of arms was originally approved for the 84th Field Artillery Regiment on 3 December 1936. It was redesignated for the 84th Field Artillery Battalion on 18 November 1940. It was redesignated for the 84th Artillery Regiment on 28 October 1958. It was amended to add a crest on 1 July 1965. The insignia was redesignated effective 1 September 1971, for the 84th Field Artillery Regiment.

== Current configuration ==
- 1st Battalion, 84th Field Artillery Regiment
- 2nd Battalion, 84th Field Artillery Regiment
- 3rd Battalion, 84th Field Artillery Regiment
- 4th Battalion, 84th Field Artillery Regiment
- 5th Battalion, 84th Field Artillery Regiment
- 6th Battalion, 84th Field Artillery Regiment

== See also ==
- Field Artillery Branch
- United States Army Coast Artillery Corps
- 9th Infantry Division
