= 81st Field Artillery Regiment =

- 81st FA coat of arms
- Active: 1917
- Country: United States
- Branch: United States Army
- Type: Field artillery
- Motto: Libertas Justitia Humanitas

Insignia
- Distinctive unit insignia

The 81st Field Artillery Regiment is a field artillery regiment of the United States Army.

== History ==
=== Pershing ===
==== 1st Battalion, 81st Field Artillery Regiment ====
The 1st Missile Battalion, 81st Artillery was formed at Fort Sill in 1963 and deployed to McCully Barracks in Wackernheim, West Germany under the 56th Field Artillery Group. The battalion moved to Wiley Barracks, Neu-Ulm in 1968 and was redesignated the 1st Battalion, 81st Field Artillery Regiment effective 1 September 1971. It was initially equipped with eight Pershing 1 missiles and in 1969 replaced these with 36 Pershing 1a missiles. Service Battery was inactivated and reflagged as B Company, 55th Maintenance Battalion in 1982. The battalion exchanged the Pershing 1a missiles for Pershing II missiles in 1984. The battalion was inactivated in 1986 and reflagged as the 1st Battalion, 9th Field Artillery Regiment.

Commanders

- August 1963 – July 1965: Lieutenant Colonel W.R. Harris
- August 1965 – July 1967: Lieutenant Colonel R.S. Fye
- July 1967 – June 1969: Lieutenant Colonel W.C Phillips Jr.
- July 1969 – January 1971: Lieutenant Colonel J Goldstein
- January 1971 – July 1972: Lieutenant Colonel Chester F Cambell
- July 1972 – January 1974: Lieutenant Colonel Harry W Crandall
- January 1974 – August 1975: Lieutenant Colonel J.S. Hornsby
- August 1975 – February 1977: Lieutenant Colonel S.J. Zagalak
- February 1977 – January 1979: Lieutenant Colonel J.W Hutchison
- February 1979 – January 1981: Lieutenant Colonel J.E. Tindall
- February 1981 - January 1984: Lieutenant Colonel J. Bachman
- February 1984 - January 1986: Lieutenant Colonel H. W. Reichert

== Heraldry ==
=== Distinctive unit insignia ===
- Descriptio: A Silver color metal and enamel device 1 1/16 inches (2.7 cm) in height consisting of a shield blazoned: Gules, a cross Or, quarter voided of the field. In dexter chief on a canton ermine an orle Sable (from the coat of arms of the 11th Cavalry). Attached below the shield a Silver scroll inscribed "LIBERATAS JUSTITIA HUMANITAS" in Black letters.
- Symbolism: The 23rd Cavalry was organized at Chickamauga in May 1917, and in November of the same year it was transformed into Field Artillery. This dual character is shown by the colors of the shield. The regiment saw service in Brittany which is indicated by the ermine canton. The coat of arms for Brittany is a shield of ermine. The 81st Artillery was formerly the 23rd Cavalry which was organized from a portion of the 11th Cavalry. This is indicated by the black line within the border of the canton taken from the arms of the 11th Cavalry.
- Background: The distinctive unit insignia was originally approved for the 81st Field Artillery Battalion on 19 March 1942. It was redesignated for the 81st Airborne Field Artillery Battalion on 31 July 1956. The insignia was redesignated for the 81st Artillery Regiment on 24 October 1958. It was again redesignated for the 81st Field Artillery Regiment effective 1 September 1971.

=== Coat of arms ===
- Blazon and Shield: Gules, a cross Or, quarter voided of the field. In dexter chief on a canton ermine an orle Sable (from the coat of arms of the 11th Cavalry).
- Crest- On a wreath of the colors Or and Gules, a cannon of the first in saltire with a cavalry saber Argent hilted of the first, surmounted by a demi-pegasus rampant of the last winged of the third.
- Motto- LIBERTAS JUSTITIA HUMANITAS.
- Symbolism- The 23rd Cavalry was organized at Chickamauga in May 1917, and in November of the same year it was transformed into Field Artillery. This dual character is shown by the colors of the shield and wreath, and by the crossed cannon and saber of the crest. The regiment saw service in Brittany which is indicated by the ermine canton. The coat of arms for Brittany is a shield of ermine. The 81st Artillery was formerly the 23rd Cavalry which was organized from a portion of the 11th Cavalry. This is indicated by the black line within the border of the canton taken from the arms of the 11th Cavalry.
- Background- The coat of arms was originally approved for the 81st Field Artillery Regiment on 7 September 1921. It was redesignated for the 81st Field Artillery Battalion on 5 February 1951. It was redesignated for the 81st Airborne Field Artillery Battalion on 31 July 1956. The insignia was redesignated for the 81st Artillery Regiment on 24 October 1958. It was again redesignated for the 81st Field Artillery Regiment effective 1 September 1971.

== See also ==
- U.S. Field Artillery
- U.S. Coast Artillery Corps
