= M656 =

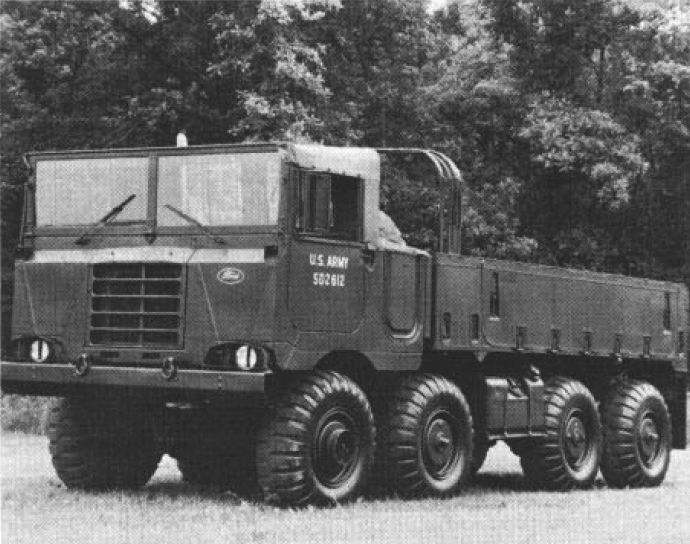
- The XM656 prototype

Overview
- Type: 5-ton 8x8 cargo truck
- Manufacturer: Ford
- Production: 1968–1969
- Assembly: United States

Body and chassis
- Related: M757, M791

Powertrain
- Engine: Continental LDS-465-2 multifuel engine

Dimensions
- Length: 278 inches (M656 & M757), 314 inches (M791)

The M656 is a 5-ton 8x8 U.S. military heavy cargo truck. It was used to support the Pershing 1a missile system.

== Development ==
The M656 vehicles evolved from the XM543E2 program. The testing program ended in 1964.

== Variants ==
- XM656- Prototype M656
- XM757- Prototype M757
- XM791- Prototype M791
- M656- Cargo version used to carry the Pershing 1a missile Programmer Test Station and Power Station
- M757- Tractor used to tow M790 Pershing 1a missile erector launcher
- M791- Van version used for the Pershing 1a Battery Control Central
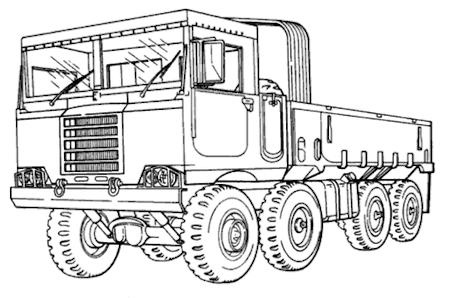
M656 cargo truck

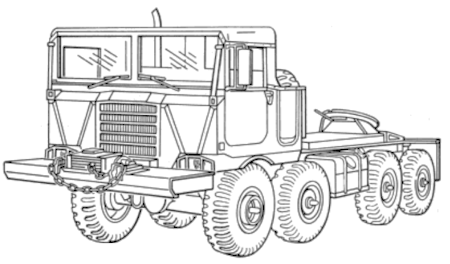
M757 tractor

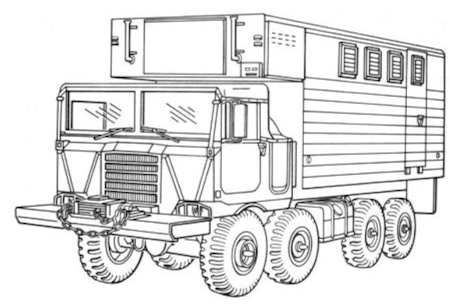
M791 van
