= Multi-Domain Command Europe =

Force Field Artillery Headquarters for U.S. Army Europe and Africa

- Active: 56th Coast Artillery Brigade (1942–1943); 56th Anti-Aircraft Artillery Brigade (1943–1945) (1951–1958); 56th Artillery Brigade (1958–1964) (1970–1972); 56th Field Artillery Brigade (1972–1986); 56th Field Artillery Command (1986–1991); 56th Artillery Command (2021-2025); Multi-Domain Command-Europe (2025-present)
- Country: United States
- Branch: United States Army
- Part of: United States Army Europe and Africa
- Garrison/HQ: Clay Kaserne, Mainz-Kastel
- Mottos: "Quick, Reliable, Accurate"
- Engagements: Northern France Campaign; Central Europe Campaign; Rhineland Campaign
- Decorations: Superior Unit Award (1983–1986); Croix de guerre (Belgium); Belgian fourragère

Commanders
- Current commander: BG Steven P. Carpenter
- Command Sergeant Major: CSM Caleb C. Webster

Insignia
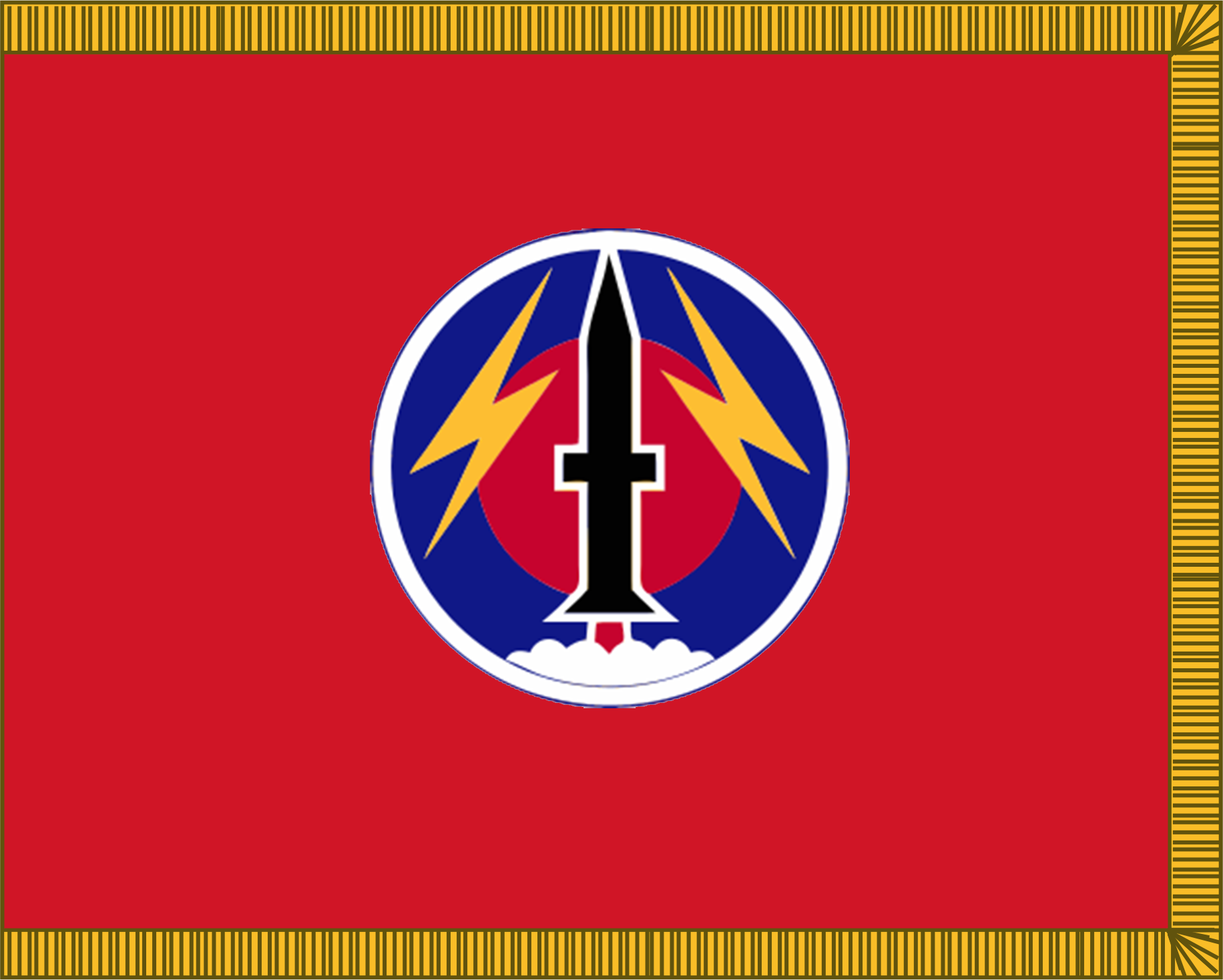
- Multi Domain Command Europe Flag

Multi-Domain Command Europe (MDC-E) is a command of the United States Army. It is the Force Field Artillery Headquarters for U.S. Army Europe and Africa, tasked to "synchronize, integrate, and control fires and effects" for U.S. land forces.

It was originally formed on 14 September 1942, as the 56th Coast Artillery Brigade and has been reorganized and redesignated several times until its inactivation on 30 June 1991, following the reunification of Germany and the end of the Cold War. United States Army Europe and Africa conducted the reactivation ceremony for the 56th Artillery Command on 8 November 2021, at Lucius D. Clay Kaserne, Wiesbaden, Germany. At the change of command ceremony on July 11, 2025 56th Artillery Command was renamed the Multi-Domain Command Europe (MDC-E).

== History ==
The 56th Coast Artillery Brigade was organized in the Army of the United States on 14 September 1942, and over six months later, it was activated at Camp Stewart, Georgia on 10 April 1943. The unit was reorganized and redesignated as the 56th Antiaircraft Artillery Brigade on 28 May 1943 and deployed to the European Theater for operations in World War II. The 56th deployed from England to Belgium and played a crucial role in the defense of the Allies’ most important port, Antwerp Harbor, from October 1944 to March 1945. The 56th defended the port from V-1 and V-2 rockets, conducting 24 hour operations during a 175-day bombardment. For the Defense of Antwerp Harbor, the Headquarters Battery earned two Belgian Army Order of the Day citations and the Belgian Fourragère. During World War Two, the 56th earned campaign participation credits for the Northern France, the Rhineland, and the Central Europe campaigns before participating in the occupation of Germany. Headquarters & Headquarters Battery is entitled to permanently display the Belgian Fourragère from the spearhead of its guidon.

The 56th was inactivated 3 December 1945 at Camp Shanks, New York.

=== 56th Antiaircraft Artillery Brigade ===
On 10 February 1951, the 56th Antiaircraft Artillery (AAA) Brigade was reactivated at Camp Edwards, Massachusetts and assigned to the United States First Army. On 5 November 1951, The 56th AAA Brigade transferred from Camp Edwards to Fort Devens, Massachusetts and was assigned to the Eastern Army Antiaircraft Command. They were then transferred to Fort Totten, New York on 24 January 1953. The unit transferred back to Fort Devens on 15 July 1956. They were redesignated as the 56th Air Defense Artillery Brigade on 20 March 1958.

The 56th Artillery Brigade was inactivated on 24 December 1964, in Coventry, Rhode Island.

=== 56th Artillery Group/Brigade ===
On 18 April 1963, the 56th Artillery Group was activated in Schwäbisch Gmünd, West Germany commanded by Col. Douglas C. France, Jr. The group prepared for the deployment of the new weapons system, the Pershing 1 nuclear missile. Headquarters & Headquarters Battery (HHB) was initially stationed at Hardt Kaserne (formerly Adolf Hitler Kaserne) and moved to Bismarck Kaserne in November 1968.

In 1965, the 56th Artillery Group assumed the critical role of a Quick Reaction Alert (QRA) force and was required to maintain an element of each unit at the highest level of combat readiness. These elements were designated to react within seconds of verified orders, and the entire command was to be fully operational within 2 hours of any alert activation. The increased requirements of the QRA mission necessitated some modifications to upgrade the Pershing missile system and caused the Army to increase the number of launchers at each battalion from four to 36.

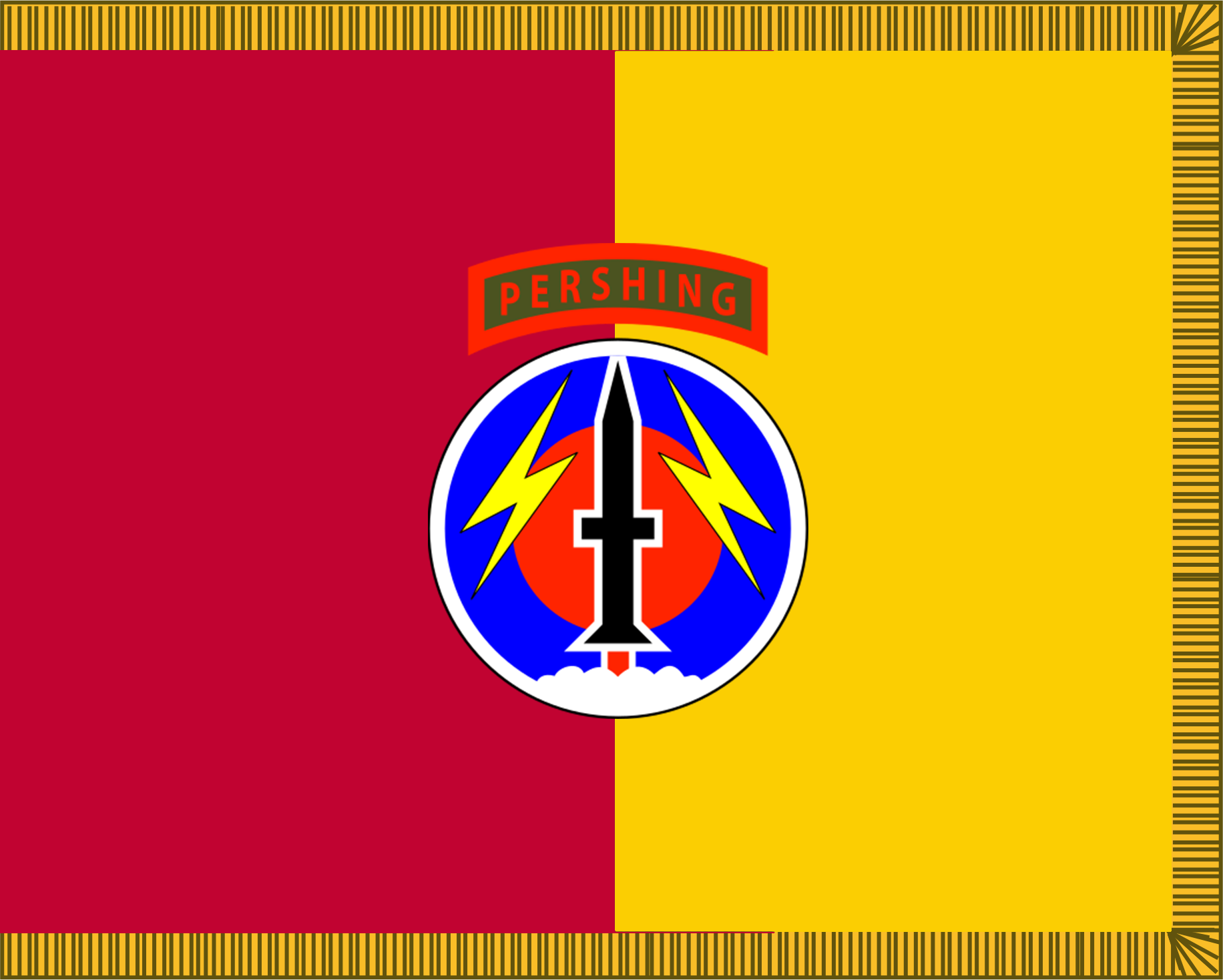
56th Artillery Brigade Flag

The 56th Artillery Group was redesignated as the 56th Artillery Brigade on 17 August 1970. The brigade was authorized an increased level in command positions in the firing units. Platoon leaders were captains, battery commanders were majors, battalion commanders were lieutenant colonels and the brigade commander was a colonel.

With the split of the Artillery Branch into Field Artillery and Air Defense Artillery, the brigade was redesignated as the 56th Field Artillery Brigade on 15 March 1972.

=== 56th Field Artillery Brigade ===
The newly designated brigade was to command 1st Battalion, 41st Field Artillery Regiment, 1st Battalion, 81st Field Artillery Regiment, and 3rd Battalion, 84th Field Artillery Regiment as Pershing firing battalions. Also subordinate to the brigade was 2nd Battalion, 4th Infantry Regiment, to meet firing units' security needs. A host of additional units provided support from medical to logistical, ensuring the brigade's ability to operate.

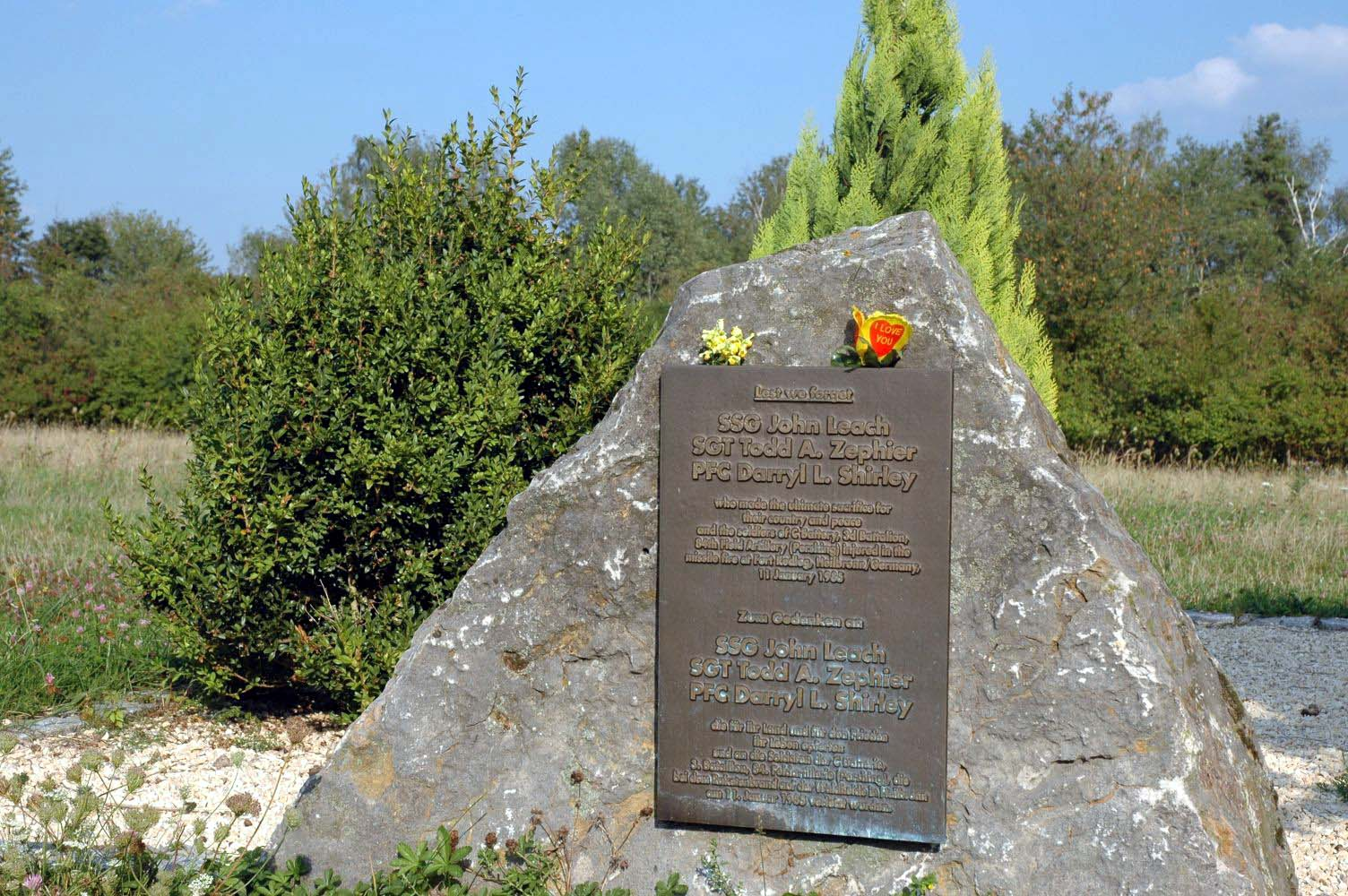
Memorial stone to the victims of the missile accident on 11 January 1985

In November 1983, with the Soviets fully invested in the SS-20, the U.S. began fielding the Pershing II. By 1985 all three firing battalions were completely operational with Pershing II. On 11 January 1985, three soldiers, Staff Sergeant John Leach, SGT Todd A. Zephier, and PFC Darryl L. Shirley of Battery C, 3rd Battalion, 84th Field Artillery were killed in an explosion at Camp Redleg, Heilbronn. The explosion occurred while removing a missile stage from the storage container during an assembly operation. An investigation revealed that the Kevlar rocket bottle had accumulated a triboelectric charge in the cold dry weather; as the engine was removed from the container the electrical charge began to flow and created a hot spot that ignited the propellant. A moratorium on missile movement was enacted through late 1986 when new grounding and handling procedures were put into place.

=== 56th Field Artillery Command ===
In January 1986, the 56th Field Artillery Brigade was upgraded in status. It was redesignated the 56th Field Artillery Command and authorized a major general as its commander. 1st Battalion, 81st Field Artillery inactivated and reformed as 1st Battalion, 9th Field Artillery in Neu-Ulm. 1st Battalion, 41st Field Artillery inactivated and reformed as 2nd Battalion, 9th Field Artillery in Schwäbisch-Gmünd. 3rd Battalion, 84th Field Artillery inactivated and reformed as 4th Battalion, 9th Field Artillery in Heilbronn. Along with 3rd Battalion, 9th Field Artillery at Fort Sill, the four firing units were then under the 9th Field Artillery Regiment. Additionally, the 55th Maintenance Battalion redesignated as 55th Support Battalion, E Company, 55th Maintenance Battalion deactivated and reformed as the 193rd Aviation Company, and the communications assets at each battery, were removed and consolidated into the 38th Signal Battalion.

1971–1991

1970–1971

1963–1970

Under the reorganization, the 56th Field Artillery Command would always report directly to the highest commander in Europe at the time. Therefore, during peacetime, they reported to the Commander in Chief of United States Army Europe (CINCUSAREUR), whereas, during heightened tension or war, command passed to NATO, with Allied Air Forces Central Europe as their next higher headquarters. Additionally, command levels for the field artillery batteries were increased by one grade over similar units. Platoons were commanded by a captain, and batteries by a major. Battalions continued to follow a lieutenant colonel while the command itself was led by a brigadier general and later a major general. These actions were meant to mitigate the increased responsibilities inherent with the mission they bore.

The Intermediate-Range Nuclear Forces Treaty was ratified on 27 May 1988. The firing batteries began to draw down their equipment as the missile launchers were destroyed. The Pershing first- and second-stage motors, reentry vehicles, warhead and radar section airframes were returned to Pueblo Depot Activity for elimination. On 30 June 1991, the 56th FA was inactivated, and "discontinued" on 30 September 1991.

Commanders

- April 1963: Colonel Douglas Carter France, Jr.
- August 1965: Colonel Rex H. Hampton, Sr.
- 15 July 1967: Colonel Patrick William Powers
- November 1968: Colonel James Edward Convey, Jr.
- September 1970: Colonel Patrick William Powers; promoted to Brig. Gen.
- December 1972: Brigadier General Tom Judson Perkins; died 24 February 1973
- February 1973: Colonel Richard Donald Boyle; acting commander
- May 1973: Brigadier General Milton Eugene Key
- January 1975: Brigadier General Robert B. Hankins
- July 1978: Colonel Richard Donald Boyle; promoted to Brigadier General
- July 1980: Colonel Sidney Davis; promoted to Brigadier General 8 September 1980
- July 1982: Brigadier General William Earl Sweet
- 1984: Brigadier General Raymond E. Haddock; promoted to Major General 4 August 1987
- 1987: Brigadier General Roger K. Bean; promoted to Major General 24 August 1989

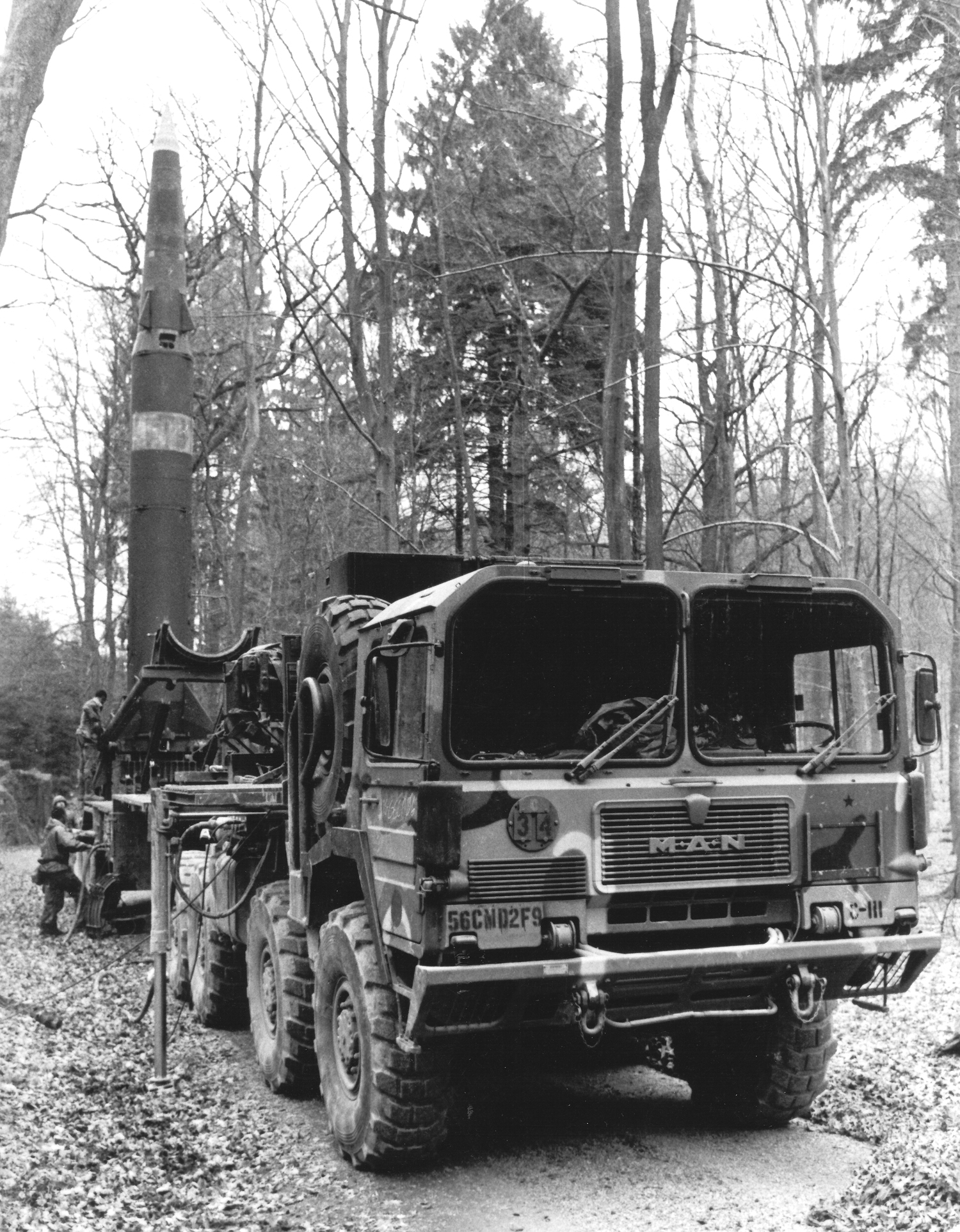
Pershing II of 2nd Battalion, 9th Field Artillery

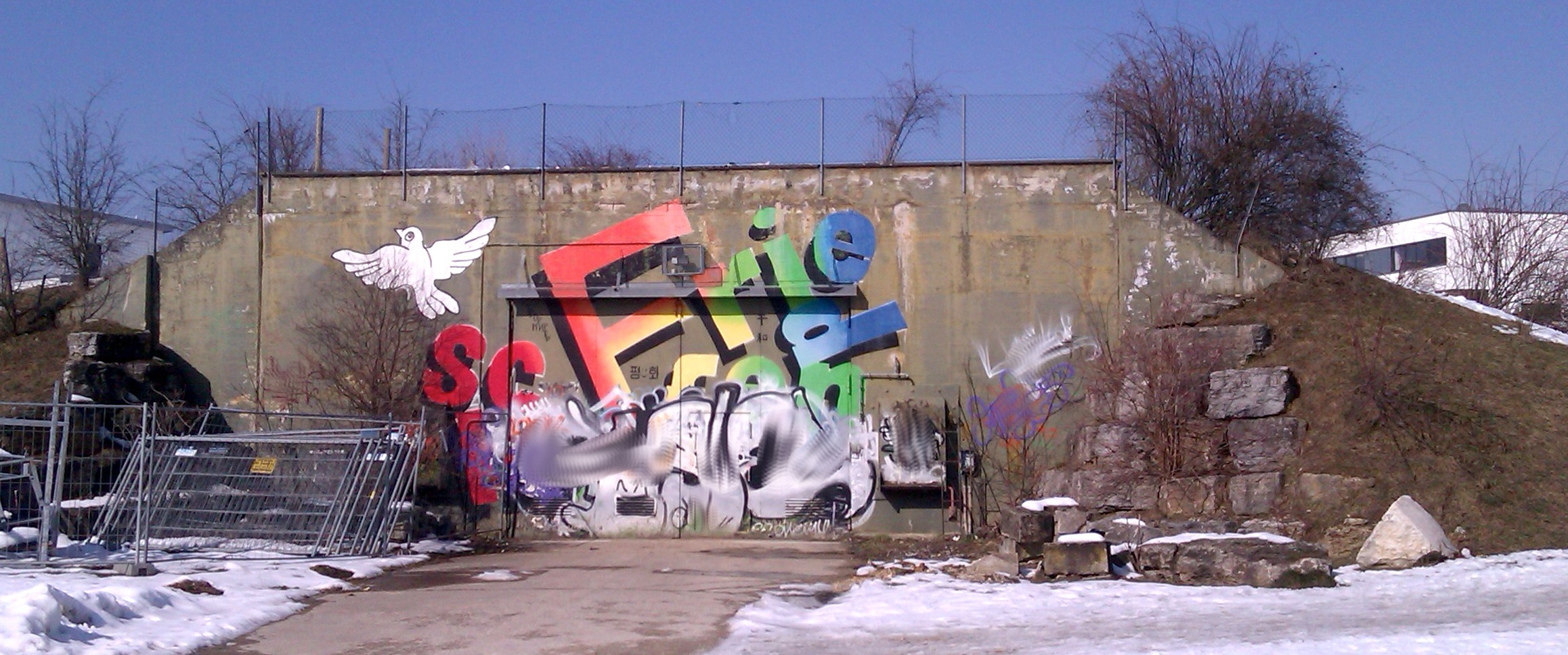
Graffiti covered bunker photographed in 2013 at the former missile storage area (MSA) in Mutlangen near Schwäbisch Gmünd

==== 266th Chemical Detachment ====
The 266th Chemical Detachment was activated as part of the 56th Field Artillery Brigade on 13 September 1972. The detachment was attached to Headquarters and Headquarters Battery, 56th Field Artillery Brigade and was garrisoned at Bismark Kaserne in Schwäbisch Gmünd.

==== 55th Support Battalion ====
The 55th Maintenance Battalion activated as part of the 56th Field Artillery Brigade in 1982. The 579th Ordnance Company deactivated and reformed as Headquarters Company and D Company. The three service batteries in the field artillery battalions deactivated and reformed as forward service companies A, B and C under the 55th. The aviation sections of each field artillery battalion reorganized as E Company.

==== 38th Signal Battalion ====
When the 56th FAC reorganized on 17 January 1986, the communication's sections from each of the subordinate field artillery battalions were consolidated into the reactivated 38th Signal Battalion. The subordinate units of the 38th were:

- Headquarters and Headquarters Company (HHC) in Schwäbisch Gmünd
- A Company supporting 2nd Battalion, 9th Field Artillery Regiment in Schwäbisch Gmünd
- B Company supporting 1st Battalion, 9th Field Artillery Regiment in Neu-Ulm
- C Company supporting 4th Battalion, 9th Field Artillery Regiment in Heilbronn
- D Company in Schwäbisch Gmünd

==== 193rd Aviation Company ====
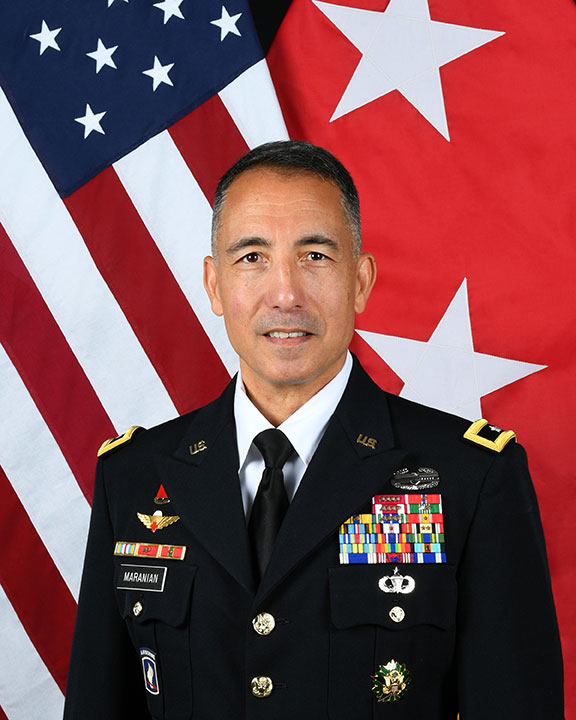
Major General Stephen J. Maranian

Under the January 1986 reorganization, E Company, 55th Maintenance Battalion was deactivated and reformed as the 193rd Aviation Company at Cooke Barracks in Göppingen. The unit operated thirteen Bell UH-1 Iroquois helicopters. In June 1988, UH-1H airframe number 68-15387 of the 193rd struck a power line during low visibility conditions and crashed near Hittistetten, Senden, West Germany, killing three soldiers.

==== Decorations ====
In 1968 the group created the Pershing Professionals Badge to recognize individual proficiency on the Pershing missile system. It was awarded through 1979.

The Superior Unit Award was presented to the 56th Field Artillery Command and its subordinate units for service during the Pershing II fielding, 1 November 1983 through 31 December 1986.

=== Twenty-first century ===
On 12 August 2021, U.S. Army Europe and Africa announced that the command would be reactivated in October 2021 as the 56th Artillery Command. The two-star Theater Fires Command was stood up and led by MG Stephen J. Maranian and was stationed in Mainz-Kastel, near the Army's four-star headquarters in Wiesbaden.

Maranian focused the 56th Artillery Command on building interoperability with NATO Allies through engagement with senior leaders of NATO armies, and through the unit's exercise program. During 2022, the 56th's exercises tested new concepts for linking artillery forces. During Exercise Dynamic Front '22 in July, 2022 the unit successfully paired a U.S. artillery brigade with a multinational fires brigade comprising 11 nations, with NATO’s Allied Rapid Reaction Corps providing command and control; a notable "first". Interoperability efforts were notable in the high north, visiting Scandinavian and Baltic nations and exercising interoperability in bi-lateral training events.

In 2023, the 56th continued efforts to enhance NATO armies’ artillery interoperability visiting several Allied nations, hosting an International Fires Warfighting Forum in Wiesbaden, Germany, and setting conditions for the Dynamic Front 2023 Exercise in Grafenwöhr, Germany and Oksbøl, Denmark. Exercise Dynamic Front 23 proved to be the most significant Artillery interoperability exercise that the NATO Alliance had every conducted bringing together 18 nations to demonstrate technical, procedural and human interoperability. The exercise included a number of "firsts" including operating over a live Mission Partnered Environment, inclusion of Naval Gunfire, and simultaneous execution of live fire in three nations - Denmark, Germany, and Romania.

On 17 February 2023, the Army announced that BG Andrew Gainey would succeed MG Maranian in command of the 56th Artillery Command. The change of command took place on July, 11, 2023 with Gainey becoming the second commander of the Army's only Theater Fires Command. Maranian retired in a small ceremony in Wiesbaden, Germany on 14 July 2023.

=== Establishment of Multi-Domain Command - Europe ===
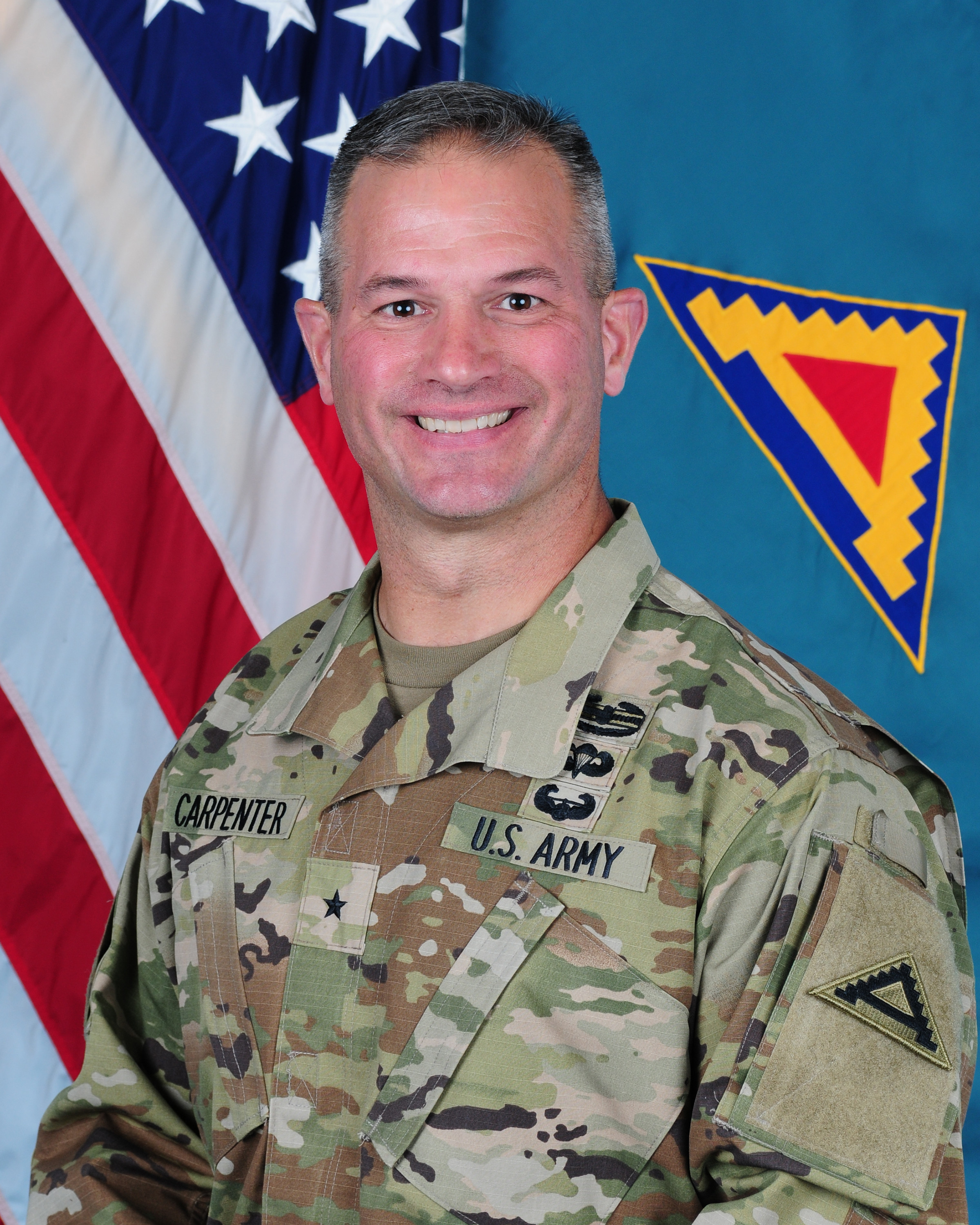
Brigadier General Steven P. Carpenter, 56th Artillery Command, Commanding General.

Maj. Gen. Andrew C. Gainey, relinquished command to, U.S. Army Maj. Gen. John L. Rafferty, Jr. at Clay Kaserne, Germany, 13 June 2024. Rafferty relinquished command to Brig. Gen. Steven P. Carpenter on 10 July 2025. It was also announced that the 56th Artillery Command would now become the Multi-Domain Command - Europe (MDC-E). The MDC-E will be the Army’s first permanent multi-domain operations command, combining traditional long-range artillery with space, cyberspace, land, air, and maritime domains as a part of the Army wide structure transformation - the Army Transformation Initiative.

== Historic subordinate units ==
April 1963

- Headquarters and Headquarters Battery (HHB)
- 4th Battalion, 41st Field Artillery Regiment (4-41st FAR)
- 1st Battalion, 81st Field Artillery Regiment (1-81st FAR)
- 3rd Battalion, 84th Field Artillery Regiment (3-84th FAR)

September 1970

- Headquarters and Headquarters Battery (HHB)
- 4th Battalion, 41st Field Artillery Regiment (4-41st FAR)
- 1st Battalion, 81st Field Artillery Regiment (1-81st FAR)
- 3rd Battalion, 84th Field Artillery Regiment (3-84th FAR)
- 2nd Battalion, 4th Infantry Regiment

September 1972

- Headquarters and Headquarters Battery (HHB)
- 266th Chemical Detachment
- 1st Battalion, 41st Field Artillery Regiment (1-41st FAR)
- 1st Battalion, 81st Field Artillery Regiment (1-81st FAR)
- 3rd Battalion, 84th Field Artillery Regiment (3-84th FAR)
- 2nd Battalion, 4th Infantry Regiment

1982

- Headquarters and Headquarters Battery (HHB)
- 266th Chemical Detachment
- 1st Battalion, 41st Field Artillery Regiment (1-41st FAR)
- 1st Battalion, 81st Field Artillery Regiment (1-81st FAR)
- 3rd Battalion, 84th Field Artillery Regiment (3-84th FAR)
- 2nd Battalion, 4th Infantry Regiment
- 55th Maintenance Battalion

January 1986 - May 1991

- Headquarters and Headquarters Battery (HHB)
- 266th Chemical Detachment
- 1st Battalion, 9th Field Artillery Regiment (1-9th FAR)
- 2nd Battalion, 9th Field Artillery Regiment (2-9th FAR)
- 4th Battalion, 9th Field Artillery Regiment (4-9th FAR)
- 2nd Battalion, 4th Infantry Regiment
- 55th Support Battalion
- 193rd Aviation Company
- 38th Signal Battalion

== Structure ==
As of January 2026 the Multi-Domain Command Europe consists of the following units:

- Multi-Domain Command Europe, in Mainz-Kastel (Germany)
  - Headquarters and Headquarters Battery, in Mainz-Kastel (Germany)
  - 19th Battlefield Coordination Detachment, at Ramstein Air Base (Germany)
  - 2nd Multi-Domain Task Force, in Mainz-Kastel, Germany
    - Headquarters and Headquarters Battalion
    - 2nd Multi-Domain Effects Battalion
    - 3rd Battalion, 12th Field Artillery Regiment (Long-Range Fires Battalion (1-17 LRFB) at Fort Drum (NY) and equipped with Long-Range Hypersonic Weapon)
    - Indirect Fire Protection Capability Battalion (IFPC) (to be formed)
    - Task Force Sustainment Battalion (to be formed)
      - 228th Brigade Support Company

== Heraldry ==
=== Shoulder sleeve insignia ===
Description. On a disc shaped embroidered item edged with a 1/8 inch (0.32 cm) White border, upon a torteau and between two lightning bolts chevronwise Or, a stylized missile ascending palewise Sable, emitting fire Gules, all edged Argent, and a demi-cloud in base of the last. The overall dimensions are 3 inches (7.6 cm) in diameter.

Symbolism: Scarlet and gold (yellow) are the colors used for Field Artillery; blue denotes the assigned infantry support. The destructive power and target capability of the missile are suggested by the red disc at center and the upright missile signifies the readiness of the unit. The lightning flashes refer to the ability of the missile team to act and strike quickly in event of need.

Background: The shoulder sleeve insignia was originally approved for the 56th Artillery Brigade on 9 June 1971. It was redesignated for the 56th Field Artillery Brigade on 7 April 1972. The insignia was redesignated effective 17 January 1986 for the 56th Field Artillery Command. It was redesignated for the 56th Artillery Command on 4 August 2021.

Previous insignia: From 1963 to 1970, the authorized shoulder sleeve insignia was the emblem of the Seventh United States Army. From 1970 to 1971, the Pershing tab was worn with the Seventh Army insignia.

=== Distinctive unit insignia ===
The distinctive unit insignia (DUI) was authorized for wear only for Headquarters and Headquarters Battery (HHB).

==== 2021- ====
Description: A gold metal device 1 3/16 inches (3.0 cm) in height overall, consisting of a trilobated cloud Gules throughout, bearing and upon two cannons in saltire, points to chief, a domed tower Argent with an archway Sable (as depicted on the coat of arms of the city of Antwerp, Belgium) surmounted on a field fesswise in base Vert. Overall in base, a semi-circular Gold scroll inscribed "QUICK RELIABLE ACCURATE" in Black letters.

Symbolism: Scarlet and yellow (gold) are the colors used for Field Artillery. The trilobated cloud symbolizes the Headquarters and Headquarters Battery, 56th Field Artillery Brigade's Northern France, Central Europe and Rhineland Campaigns during World War II. The crossed cannons with the Antwerp Tower allude to the Headquarters Battery's two Belgian Army Order of the Day Citations, the Belgian Fourragere for action at Antwerp and the Defense of Antwerp Harbor. Red and green are the colors of the Belgian Fourragere. The "Pershing Missile" alludes to the unique mission of the unit as a participant in the Army's first Nuclear Strike Force with missiles on constant alert (QRA).

Present Day

1968–1972

Background: The distinctive unit insignia was originally approved for the 56th Field Artillery Brigade on 11 April 1972. It was redesignated effective 17 January 1986 for the 56th Field Artillery Command. It was redesignated for the 56th Artillery Command on 4 August 2021.

==== 1972 ====
Description: A gold color metal and enamel device 1 3/16 inches (30 mm) in height overall consisting of a scarlet background with a trilobated cloud at the top bearing two black crossed cannons behind a white domed tower with black archway, (as depicted on the coat of arms of the city of Antwerp, Belgium) on a green base, surmounted overall by a vertical gold Pershing missile; all above a semi-circular gold scroll inscribed "Quick Reliable Accurate" in black letters.

Symbolism: Scarlet and yellow (gold) are the colors used for Field Artillery. The trilobated cloud symbolizes the Headquarters and Headquarters Battery, 56th Field Artillery Brigade's Northern France, Central Europe and Rhineland Campaigns during World War II. The crossed cannons with the Antwerp Tower allude to the Headquarters Battery's two Belgian Army Order of the Day Citations, the Belgian Fourragere for action at Antwerp and the Defense of Antwerp Harbor. Red and green are the colors of the Belgian Fourragere. The Pershing missile alludes to the unique mission of the unit as a participant in the Army's first nuclear strike force with missiles on constant alert (QRA).

Background: The distinctive unit insignia was originally approved for the 56th Field Artillery Brigade on 11 April 1972. It was redesignated effective 17 January 1986 for the 56th Field Artillery Command.

Note: The older DUI was worn from 1967 to 1972.

==== 1968 ====
Description: A gold colored metal and enamel device 1 3/16 inches (30 mm) in height overall, vesica on top and ovaloid in base consisting of a gold missile with billowing white exhaust behind and between two vertical gold cannon firing black bomb bursts on a red background. All arched by a gold nebuly and encircled in base by a gold scroll bearing the inscription "QUICK, RELIABLE, ACCURATE" in black letters.

Symbolism: Scarlet is the color used for Artillery. The cannon barrels symbolize the basic mission of the organization. The missile alludes to the "Pershing Missile" and to the unique mission of the unit as a participant in the Army's first Nuclear Strike Force with missiles on constant alert (QRA).

Background: The distinctive unit insignia was approved on 24 September 1968. It was rescinded on 14 February 1975.

== Bibliography ==
- History Card, 56th Coast Artillery Brigade, 56th Antiaircraft Artillery Brigade, 56th Artillery Brigade, 56th Field Artillery Brigade, 56th Field Artillery Command. United States Army. 30 September 1991. WD AGO Form 016.
- Lineage and Honors: Headquarters and Headquarters Battery, 56th Field Artillery Command. Department of the Army.
