= 41st Field Artillery Regiment =

- Coat of arms
- Active: 1918
- Country: United States
- Branch: United States Army
- Type: Field artillery
- Role: Field Artillery
- Size: Regiment
- Motto: Mission Accomplished
- Branch color: Scarlet
- Engagements: World War II; Operation Desert Storm; Operation Iraqi Freedom; Operation Enduring Freedom

Insignia
- Distinctive unit insignia

The 41st Field Artillery Regiment is a regiment of the Field Artillery Branch of the United States Army (USA).

The regiment's single active battalion is the 1st Battalion, 41st Field Artillery Regiment, 1st Armored Brigade Combat Team, 3rd Infantry Division, located at Fort Stewart, Georgia (U.S. state).

== History ==
=== Prior to World War II ===
The 1st Battalion, 41st Field Artillery was constituted 26 August 1918 in the Regular Army as the 41st Artillery (Coast Artillery Corps) in Hawaii.

=== World War II ===
The 1-41 was redesignated 1 October 1940 as the 41st Field Artillery Battalion, assigned to the 3d Division (later redesignated as the 3d Infantry Division), and activated at Fort Lewis, Washington.

During the Second World War, the 1-41 Field Artillery Battalion's arsenal consisted of 105 mm howitzers. The battalion participated in 10 campaigns during the war: Algeria-French Morocco (with arrowhead), Tunisia, Sicily (with arrowhead), Naples-Foggia, Anzio (with arrowhead), Rome-Arno, Southern France (with arrowhead), Rhineland, Central Europe and the Central Pacific.

The 1-41 received the Presidential Unit Citation and French Croix de Guerre with Palm decorations for the battle at the Colmar Pocket. The town in the Alsace region along the Rhine River was the final foothold in France that the Germans were attempting to hold. The battle began on 22 January 1945 and lasted until 9 February 1945.

Timeline:

- North Africa: 8 Nov 1942 - 11 Nov 1942
- Sicily: 9 Jul 1943 - 17 Aug 1943
- Italy:
  - Naples-Foggia: 9 Sep 1943 - 21 Jan 1944
  - Anzio: 22 Jan 1944 - 22 May 1944
  - Rome-Arno: 22 Jan 1944 - 9 Sep 1944
- Southern France: 15 Aug 1944 - 14 Sep 1944
- Rhineland: 15 Sep 1944 - 21 Mar 1945
- Central Europe: 22 Mar 1945 - 11 May 1945
- Central Pacific: 7 Dec 1941 - 6 Dec 1943

=== Pershing missiles during the Cold War ===
==== 4th Missile Battalion, 41st Artillery Regiment ====
The 4th Missile Battalion, 41st Artillery Regiment was activated on 14 January 1963 per General Order 428 at Fort Sill, Oklahoma, with four Pershing 1 missiles. Lt. Col. Fitzpatrick took command on 21 July 1963. The battalion began training and completed live fires at Fort Wingate, New Mexico. The battalion and equipment shipped aboard the USAT General Simon B. Buckner on 3 April 1964 bound for West Germany. The unit deployed to Schwäbisch Gmünd under the 56th Artillery Group and was garrisoned at Hardt and Bismark Kasernes. The battalion increased to six launchers in 1964 and to eight launchers in 1965. The battalion exchanged the Pershing 1 missiles for 36 Pershing 1a missiles in 1969.

The battalion was inactivated on 29 September 1972 by General Order 1033 and reflagged as the 1st Battalion, 41st Field Artillery Regiment.

Commanders

- 21 July 1963: Lieutenant Colonel Fitzpatrick
- July 1965: Lieutenant Colonel Milton Leland Haskin
- July 1967: Lieutenant Colonel William H. Goodwin
- July 1969: Thomas E. de Sharo
- 1970: Lieutenant Colonel Charles E. Bush
- 1972: Lieutenant Colonel Larry H. Hunt

==== 1st Battalion, 41st Field Artillery Regiment ====
1st Battalion, 41st Field Artillery was activated on 29 September 1972 in Schwäbisch Gmünd, West Germany. Service Battery was inactivated and reflagged as A Company, 55th Maintenance Battalion in 1982. The battalion exchanged the Pershing 1a missiles for Pershing II missiles in 1984. The battalion was inactivated in 1986 and reflagged as the 2nd Battalion, 9th Field Artillery Regiment.

Commanders

- 1972: Lieutenant Colonel Larry H. Hunt
- December 1973: Lieutenant Colonel Raymond E. Haddock
- June 1975: Lieutenant Colonel Stan King
- December 1976: Lieutenant Colonel Fred Pope
- 1978: Lieutenant Colonel Gerald R. Lauzon
- 24 June 1980: Lieutenant Colonel Myron F. Curtis
- 2 July 1983: Lieutenant Colonel Doug Middleton
- 1985-1986 Lieutenant David E. Bronner

Notable members

- Brigadier General William C. Bilo
- General Raymond T. Odierno

=== Operation Desert Storm ===
For Operation Desert Storm, the 1-41 received campaign participation credit for Defense of Saudi Arabia, Liberation of Kuwait and for the Cease Fire. The battalion was a part of the 24th Infantry Division (Mechanized) Artillery (24th ID(M)) and was deployed to fight Operations Desert Shield and Desert Storm beginning on 7 August 1990 until March 1991. It was a 3x8 battalion of M109A2 self-propelled howitzers in direct support of the 1st Brigade, 24th ID(M).

The 1-41st attacked into Iraq on 24 February 1991 in direct support of the 1st Brigade, 24th ID(M) attack to secure the Euphrates River Valley lines of communications. The battalion traveled a distance of 275 miles over a 96-hour period, controlled the fires of a reinforcing Field Artillery battalion (2-17 FA, 155 SP), and coordinated the positioning and fires of the 212th FA Brigade (2-18 FA, 203 SP and 3-27 FA, MLRS) which was the Force Artillery Headquarters for the 1st Brigade for portions of the ground war. The Field Artillery fired 2104 rounds of mixed FA munitions in support of 1st Brigade operations during the conflict including RAP (Rocket Assisted Projectile) and DPICM (Dual Purpose Improved Conventional Munition).

During the ground war, the battalion fired on dismounted Iraqi Infantry, artillery battalions, an ADA site, and numerous enemy vehicles. The 1-41 supported in destroying a division-sized enemy column in the Rumaila Oil Field Causeway which led to a battle damage assessment of 24 T-72 tanks, 7 T-55 tanks, 43 BMP's, 15 BRDM's, 34 artillery pieces, 5 MT-LB's, 377 trucks, 40 jeeps, 1 ZSU-23–4, 9 BM-21's, and 1 AMX-10.

Desert Storm

- 17 Aug 1990 - 3 March 1991

=== Iraq and Afghanistan ===
The 1-41 Field Artillery Battalion fired the first rounds of Operation Iraqi Freedom in support of ground forces on 20 March 2003, destroying three observation posts and one command post along the Kuwait/Iraq border. The battalion remained in continuous enemy contact over the next 23 days, firing 5,196 rounds in direct support of 1st Brigade Combat Team, 3rd Infantry Division in the Battles of An Najaf escarpment, Al Kifl, and the battle for Saddam International Airport. The battalion earned the Presidential Unit Citation for its actions during OIF I.

In January 2005, the battalion deployed with 1st Heavy Brigade Combat Team, 3rd Infantry Division to the Salah ad Din Province in Iraq during OIF III. The battalion fired 5,869 rounds while located on four different forward operating bases in support of the Brigade's seven maneuver Battalions. 1-41 FA led the Brigade's Provincial Police Partnership Program, provided the command and control for the security of FOB Remagen, and provided the nucleus of the Brigade's Tactical Command Post at Logistics Supply Area Anaconda. Timeline: Operation Iraqi Freedom I

- Mar 2003 - Mar 2004

Operation Iraqi Freedom III

- Jan 2005 - Jan 2006

In January 2007, the battalion deployed to Al Anbar Province on Operation Iraqi Freedom V, firing 3,469 rounds in support of the Brigade's three Army maneuver Battalions and three Marine Corps Infantry Battalions. The battalion also led the Brigade's Provincial Police Partnership Program. This deploymented ended in June 2007.

On 1 October 2008, prior to its final Iraq rotation, the battalion, along with 1st HBCT trained as part of the U.S. Northern Command's Chemical, Biological, Radiological, Nuclear, and high-yield Explosive Consequence Management Response Force. During the year-long mission, the battalion task force trained with lead federal agencies on search and rescue operations and confined spaces training, and conducted check rides with local and federal police agencies.

In December 2009, 1st Battalion, 41st Field Artillery deployed to Baghdad as part of 1st HBCT, 3rd Infantry Division in an advise and assist role. This was the Operation Iraqi Freedom IX deployment. In this capacity, the battalion provided indirect fire capability, advised the Iraqi First Federal Police Division, escorted Provincial Reconstruction Teams, and supported Stability Transition Teams and national elections. The battalion returned to Fort Stewart, GA in December 2010.

From November 2012 to July 2013, the battalion deployed to Zabul Province, Afghanistan, fighting in the War in Afghanistan (2001-2021). The unit provided indirect fires from six different locations, firing over 1,000 rounds with tremendous effects, including the two longest Excalibur missions ever recorded in combat and the first ever employment of the XM1156, Precision Guidance Kit. Its Soldiers secured five Security Force Assistance Teams, mentored the Afghan Army artillery and live-fire certified three separate Afghan artillery platoons. The unit also secured Forward Operating Bases Lagman and Davis and transferred Forward Operating Bases Lagman and Al Masaak, Combat Outpost Viper, and Patrol Base 13 to Afghan Security Forces.

Beginning in April 2015 the battalion began deploying to Europe as part of the U.S. Army Regional Alignment Plan. From 2015 to 2017, the battalion took part in exercises in Lithuania, Germany, and Poland.

In 2018, the 1-41 Field Artillery Battalion took part in a National Training Centre rotation followed by a rotation to South Korea in order to support ROK Forces. In February 2020, the battalion participated in a rotation in NTC in preparation for their second rotation to South Korea in the fall of 2020 in order to continue to support the ROK Forces. The 1-41 FA BN stands ready to deploy for operations both for artillery and "full-spectrum" missions.

== Lineage ==
- Constituted 26 August 1918 in the Regular Army as the 41st Artillery (Coast Artillery Corps)
- Organized 1 October 1918 at Fort Monroe, Virginia
- Demobilized 22 December 1918 at Fort Monroe, Virginia
- Reconstituted 15 January 1921 in the Regular Army as the Hawaiian Railway Battalion
- Organized 22 December 1921 at Fort Kamehameha, Hawaii
- Redesignated 1 June 1922 as the 41st Artillery Battalion (Railway) (Coast Artillery Corps)
- Reorganized and redesignated 1 July 1924 as Battery A, 41st Coast Artillery (Railway)
- Inactivated (less 1st Battalion) 30 June 1931 at Fort Kamehameha, Hawaii
- Activated (less 1st Battalion) 21 April 1942 at Fort Hase, Hawaii
- Reorganized 22 May 1943 as Battery A, 41st Coast Artillery (Harbor Defense).
- Disbanded (less Batteries A, D, and G) 25 May 1944 at Fort Kamehameha, Hawaii (Batteries D and G - hereafter separate lineages) (Battery A concurrently reorganized and redesignated as the 831st Coast Artillery Battery; disbanded 13 August 1944 at Fort Kamehameha, Hawaii)
- Reconstituted 28 June 1950 in the Regular Army; concurrently, consolidated with Battery A, 41st Field Artillery Battalion (active) (see ANNEX), and consolidated unit designated as Battery A, 41st Field Artillery Battalion, an element of the 3d Infantry Division. (41st Field Artillery Battalion relieved 6 April 1951 from assignment to the 3d Infantry Division; reassigned 2 December 1954 to the 3d Infantry Division.)
- Inactivated 1 July 1957 at Fort Benning, Georgia, and relieved from assignment to the 3d Infantry Division; concurrently, redesignated as Headquarters and Headquarters Battery, 1st Missile Battalion, 41st Artillery, and activated in Germany (organic elements concurrently constituted and activated).
- Reorganized and redesignated 31 July 1959 as the 41st Artillery, a parent regiment under the Combat Arms Regimental System
- Battalion inactivated 25 June 1963 in Germany.
- Redesignated 1 September 1971 as the 1st Missile Battalion, 41st Field Artillery.
- Redesignated 13 September 1972 as the 1st Battalion, 41st Field Artillery, and activated in Germany.
- Inactivated 17 January 1986 in Germany.
- Assigned 16 August 1988 to the 24th Infantry Division and activated at Fort Stewart, Georgia. Relieved 15 February 1996 from assignment to the 24th Infantry Division and assigned to the 3d Infantry Division.
- Redesignated 1 October 2005 as the 1st Battalion, 41st Field Artillery Regiment.

Annex

- Constituted 5 July 1918 in the National Army as the 41st Field Artillery and assigned to the 14th Division
- Organized 10 August 1918 at Camp Custer, Michigan
- Demobilized 6 February 1919 at Camp Custer, Michigan
- Reconstituted 1 October 1933 in the Regular Army as the 41st Field Artillery
- Redesignated 1 October 1940 as the 41st Field Artillery Battalion, assigned to the 3d Division (later redesignated as the 3d Infantry Division), and activated at Fort Lewis, Washington

== Heraldry ==
=== Distinctive unit insignia ===
- Description: A gold color metal and enamel device 1 1/8 inches (2.9 cm) in height overall consisting of a shield blazoned: Gules, a bend barry of eight Argent, of the field and Azure repeated, overall a broad arrow Or. Attached below and to the sides of the shield a Gold scroll inscribed “MISSION ACCOMPLISHED” in Black letters.
- Symbolism: The bend, from the coat of arms approved for the former 41st Coast Artillery Regiment and the broad arrow from that of the 41st Field Artillery Battalion, symbolize the consolidation of these two units. The bend carries the eight bars of the old Hawaiian flag and arms indicating the origin of the 41st Coast Artillery Regiment as companies of the Coast Defenses of Honolulu. The broad arrow was used in the coat of arms of the 41st Field Artillery Battalion to symbolize celerity of movement and shock of impact.
- Background: The distinctive unit insignia was originally approved for the 41st Field Artillery Battalion on 11 January 1952. It was redesignated for the 41st Artillery Regiment on 15 April 1958. It was amended to change the description by addition of symbolism for charges taken from the original coat of arms on 26 July 1963. Effective 1 September 1971, the insignia was redesignated for the 41st Field Artillery Regiment.

=== Coat of arms ===
- Blazon and shield: Gules, a bend barry of eight Argent, of the field and Azure repeated, overall a broad arrow Or.
- Crest: On a wreath of the colors Argent and Gules a four-headed wyvern without wings of the first scaled Azure and langued Or grasping a mace Silver with seven spikes Gold charged with a roundel parti per pale Gules and Vert.
- Motto: Mission accomplished
- Symbolism
  - Shield: The bend, from the coat of arms approved for the former 41st Coast Artillery Regiment and the broad arrow from that of the 41st Field Artillery Battalion, symbolize the consolidation of these two units. The bend carries the eight bars of the old Hawaiian flag and arms indicating the origin of the 41st Coast Artillery Regiment as companies of the Coast Defenses of Honolulu. The broad arrow was used in the coat of arms of the 41st Field Artillery Battalion to symbolize celerity of movement and shock of impact.
  - Crest: The four heads of the wyvern refer to the unit's four spearhead attacks in World War II. Blue and white are the colors of the shoulder sleeve insignia of the 3d Division to which the organization is assigned. The mace and the red and green colors, from the arms of Colmar, France, refer to the unit's distinguished action during the capture of that city for which it was awarded three unit decorations. Red, green and white, the colors of the national flag of Italy, allude to the organization's action at Anzio.
  - Background: The coat of arms was originally approved for the 41st Field Artillery Battalion on 11 January 1952. It was redesignated for the 41st Artillery Regiment on 15 April 1958. It was amended to change the description by addition of symbolism for charges taken from the original coat of arms on 26 July 1963. The coat of arms was amended to add a crest on 21 April 1966. Effective 1 September 1971, the insignia was redesignated for the 41st Field Artillery Regiment.

== Campaign participation credit ==
World War II

- Algeria-French Morocco (with arrowhead)
- Tunisia
- Sicily (with arrowhead)
- Naples-Foggia
- Anzio (with arrowhead)
- Rome-Arno
- Southern France (with arrowhead)
- Rhineland
- Central Europe
- Central Pacific

Southwest Asia

- Defense of Saudi Arabia
- Liberation and Defense of Kuwait
- Cease-Fire

Global War on Terror TBD

== Decorations ==
- Presidential Unit Citation (Army), Streamer embroidered COLMAR
- Presidential Unit Citation (Army), Streamer embroidered IRAQ
- Army Superior Unit Award, Streamer embroidered 1983-1985
- Army Superior Unit Award, Streamer embroidered 1994
- Army Superior Unit Award, Streamer embroidered 2001
- French Croix de Guerre with Palm, World War II, Streamer embroidered COLMAR
- French Croix de Guerre, World War II, Fourragere

== Bibliography ==
- Floris, John P. (19 May 1992). Personal Experience Monograph 1-41st Field Artillery in Operation Desert Storm (PDF). United States Army War College.
- McKenney, Janice E. (1985). Field Artillery. Army Lineage Series. Center of Military History (CMH). Archived from the original on 5 November 2010.
- Stanton, Shelby L. (1984). Order of Battle: U.S. Army, World War II. Presidio.
- Thompson, Clinton W. (September 2017). Hell in the Snow: The U.S. Army in the Colmar Pocket, January 22 - February 9, 1945. University of Texas at Tyler.
- "Lineage and Honors: 1st Battalion, 41st Field Artillery Regiment". US Army Center of Military History. 16 June 2011. Archived from the original on 30 April 2016.
