= MGM-31 Pershing =

The MGM-31A Pershing was the missile used in the Pershing 1 and Pershing 1a field artillery missile systems. (Note: The original system was simply named Pershing but was renamed Pershing 1 in 1965 when the Pershing 1a was introduced. Military and other documentation is inconsistent in the use of Arabic and Roman numerals and in capitalization, resulting in the use of I, 1, 1a, 1A, 2, II and the like. MGM-31A is the designation of the missile only; the same missile was used in Pershing 1 and Pershing 1a.) It was a solid-fueled two-stage theater ballistic missile designed and built by Martin Marietta to replace the PGM-11 Redstone missile as the primary nuclear-capable theater-level weapon of the United States Army and replaced the MGM-1 Matador cruise missiles operated by the German Air Force. Pershing later replaced the European-based MGM-13 Mace cruise missiles deployed by the United States Air Force and the German Air Force. Development began in 1958, with the first test missile fired in 1960, the Pershing 1 system deployed in 1963 and the improved Pershing 1a deployed in 1969. The U.S. Army replaced the Pershing 1a with the Pershing II Weapon System in 1983 while the German Air Force retained Pershing 1a until all Pershings were eliminated in 1991. The U.S. Army Missile Command (MICOM) managed the development and improvements while the Field Artillery Branch deployed the systems and developed tactical doctrine.

== Pershing 1 ==
Pershing 1
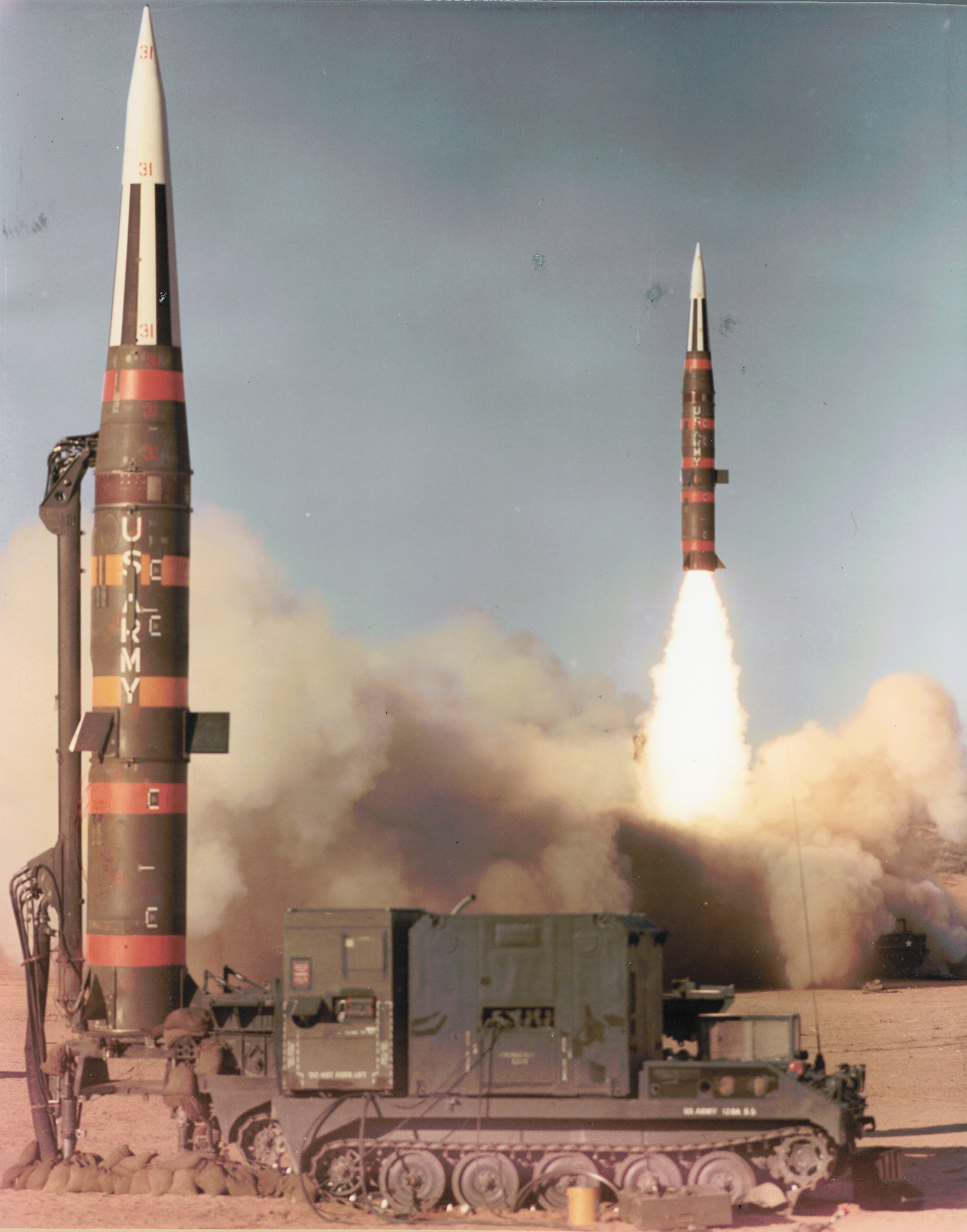
- Pershing round 32 launched from Hueco Range, Texas by A Battery, 2nd Battalion, 44th Field Artillery, targeted for White Sands Missile Range on 20 August 1963
- Type: Short-range ballistic missile
- Place of origin: United States

Service history
- In service: 1962–1969
- Used by: United States Army 24 launchers; German Air Force 16 launchers

Production history
- Designer: The Martin Company
- Designed: 1958–1960
- Manufacturer: The Martin Company Martin Marietta
- Produced: 1960–1969
- No. built: 754 MGM-31A missiles

Specifications
- Mass: 10,275 pounds (4,661 kg)
- Length: 34.6 feet (10.5 m)
- Diameter: 40 inches (1 m)
- Blast yield: W50 nuclear warhead; 60 kilotons of TNT (0.25 PJ); 200 kilotons of TNT (0.84 PJ); 400 kilotons of TNT (1.7 PJ)
- Engine: First stage: Thiokol TX-174; 25,900 pounds-force (115 kN) 38.3 s; Second stage: Thiokol TX-175; 19,100 pounds-force (85 kN) 39 s
- Operational range: 460 miles (740 km)
- Boost time: 77.3 seconds
- Maximum speed: Mach 8
- Guidance system: Eclipse-Pioneer ST-120 inertial guidance
- Steering system: Jet vanes, air vanes
- Accuracy: 1,310 feet (400 m) circular error probable
- Launch platform: M474 transporter erector launcher

=== Development ===
The Pershing Joins the Ranks (1964) Official Department of Defense promotional film reel.

George Bunker, president of the Martin Company, paid a courtesy call on General John Medaris, USA, of the Army Ballistic Missile Agency (ABMA) at Redstone Arsenal, Alabama in 1956. Medaris noted that it would be helpful to the Army if there was a missile plant near the Air Force Missile Test Center (present-day Cape Canaveral Air Force Station) in Florida. The Martin Company subsequently began construction of their Sand Lake facility in Orlando, Florida which opened in late 1957. Edward Uhl, the co-inventor of the bazooka, was the vice-president and general manager of the new factory, which continues to operate today as the Lockheed Martin Missiles and Fire Control facility.

The U.S. Army began studies in 1956 for a ballistic missile with a range of about 500–750 nautical miles (930–1,390 km; 580–860 mi). Later that year, Secretary of Defense Charles Erwin Wilson issued the "Wilson Memorandum" that removed from the U.S. Army all missiles with a range of 200 miles (320 km) or more. The United States Department of Defense (DoD) rescinded the memorandum in 1958 and ABMA began development of the class of ballistic missile.

The missile was initially called the Redstone-S, where the S meant solid propellant (and the name Redstone came from the Redstone missile it was supposed to replace), but renamed to Pershing in honor of General of the Armies John J. Pershing. ABMA selected seven companies to develop engineering proposals: Chrysler, the Lockheed Corporation, the Douglas Aircraft Company, the Convair Division of General Dynamics, the Firestone Corp., the Sperry-Rand Company, and the Martin Company.

The Secretary of the Army, Wilber M. Brucker, the former governor of Michigan – was apparently under pressure from his home state to award the contract to a company in Michigan. Chrysler was the only contractor from Michigan, but Medaris persuaded Brucker to leave the decision entirely in the hands of the ABMA. After a selection process by General Medaris and Dr. Arthur Rudolph, the Martin Company (later Martin Marietta after a merger in 1961) was awarded a CPFF (cost-plus-fixed-fee) contract for research, development, and first production of the Pershing system under the technical supervision and concept control of the government. Martin's quality control manager for the Pershing, Phil Crosby developed the concept of Zero Defects that enhanced the production and reliability of the system.

The first launch of the XM14 R&D Pershing 1 test missile (P-01) was on 25 February 1960. The first launch from the tactical transporter erector launcher (TEL) was on 26 July 1960 (P-06). For training there was an inert Pershing 1 missile designated XM19. In June 1963, the XM14 and XM19 Pershing missiles were redesignated as XMGM-31A and XMTM-31B, respectively. The production version of the tactical missile was later designated as MGM-31A and the XMTM-31B designation was dropped.

=== Deployment ===
President Eisenhower viewed the Pershing missile when he visited Cape Canaveral on 11 February 1960, and at Fort Benning on 5 May 1960 as part of Project MAN (Modern Army Needs). President Kennedy viewed Pershing three times: as part of the inaugural parade in 1961, at Fort Bragg on 12 October 1961, and at White Sands Missile Range in 1963.

Plans were for the organization of ten missile battalions: one at Fort Sill, one in Korea and eight in West Germany; this was eventually reduced to one battalion at Fort Sill and three in West Germany.

Each missile battalion organized at Fort Sill for deployment. The first tactical Pershing unit was the 2nd Missile Battalion, 44th Artillery Regiment, followed by the 4th Missile Battalion, 41st Artillery Regiment deployed to Schwäbisch Gmünd and the 1st Missile Battalion, 81st Artillery to McCully Barracks in Wackernheim. Each missile battalion had four launchers.

The 2nd Missile Battalion, 79th Artillery Regiment formed for deployment to South Korea in February 1964. The deployment was placed on hold and the battalion supported the 56th Artillery Group and the German Air Force missile wings when they launched missiles from White Sands Missile Range. The 85th U.S. Army Field Artillery Detachment was organized in Fort Sill in November 1966 and attached to 2/79th Artillery. The deployment to Korea was canceled and the 2/79th Artillery was deactivated.

The Secretary of Defense assigned the Pershing weapon system to a Quick Reaction Alert (QRA) role in 1964 after a DoD study showed that the Pershing would be superior to tactical aircraft for the QRA mission. The German Air Force began training at Fort Sill. Each missile battalion was then authorized six launchers. In 1965 this increased to eight launchers, two per firing battery. By 1965, three U.S. Army battalions and two German Air Force wings were operational in Germany. The 579th Ordnance Company was tasked with maintenance and logistical general support for the Pershing artillery units in Germany.

=== Missile ===
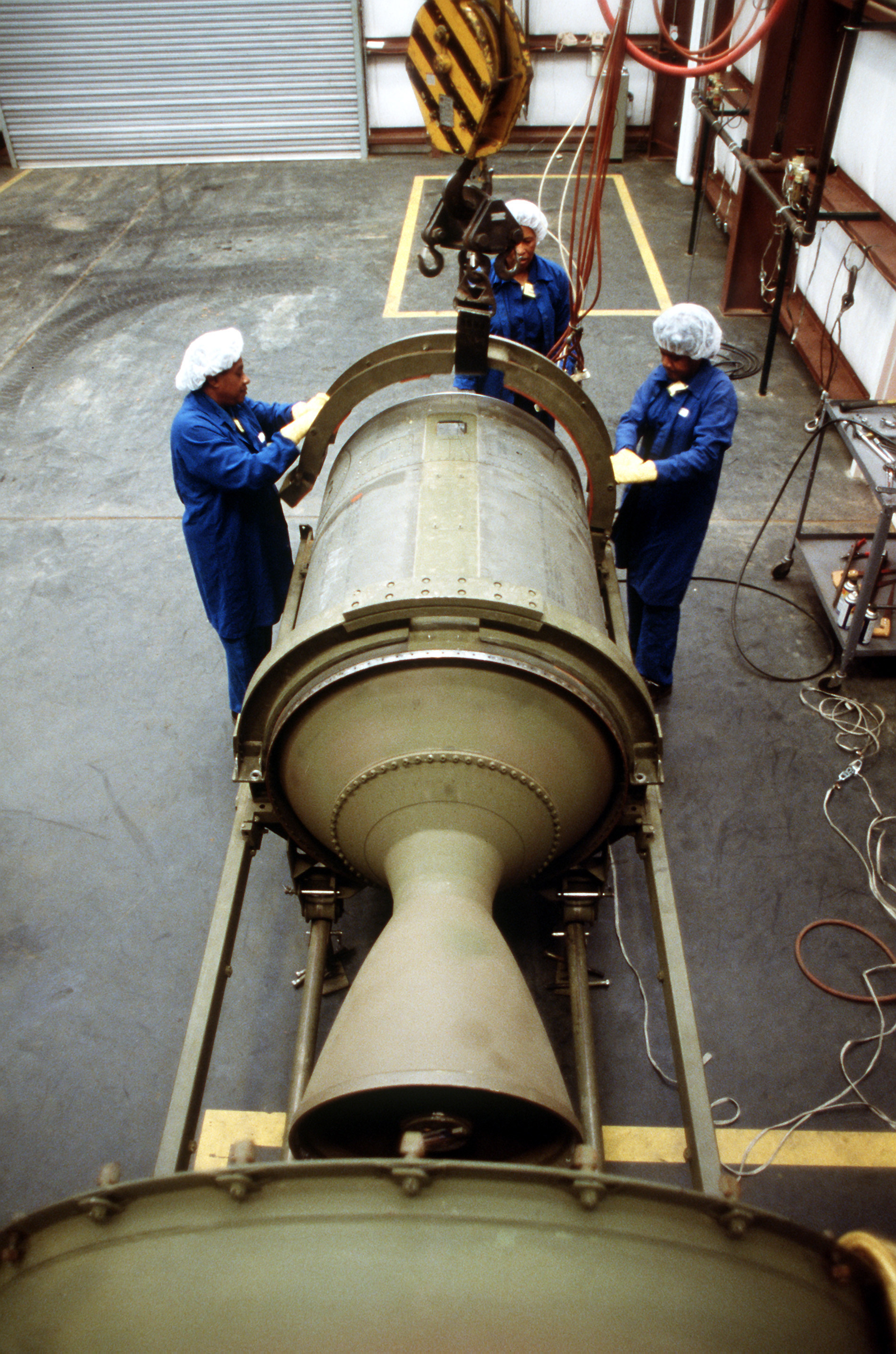
Thiokol solid-propellant motor

Two Thiokol solid-propellant motors powered the Pershing 1 missile. Since a solid-propellant motor cannot be turned off, the missile used thrust reversal and case venting for a selective range. Splice bands and explosive bolts attached the rocket motors. The missile was controlled by an analog guidance computer using a ball-and-disk integrator and a control computer. As directed by the onboard computers, the bolts exploded and ejected the splice band. Another squib would open the thrust reversal ports in the forward end of the stage and ignite the propellant in the forward end, causing the motor to reverse direction. Testing found that the second stage would draft behind the warhead and cause it to drift off course, so explosive charges on the side of the motor opened the case and vented the propellant. The range could be graduated but the maximum was 740 kilometres (400 nmi). Jet vanes in the motor nozzles and air vanes on the motor case steered the missile. The onboard analog guidance computer and the Eclipse-Pioneer ST-120 (Stable Table-120) inertial navigation system provided guidance. The warhead could be conventional explosive or a W50 nuclear weapon with three yield options— the Y1 with 60 kiloton yield, Y2 with 200 kiloton yield and Y3 with 400 kiloton yield; the conventional warhead was never deployed.

=== Ground equipment ===
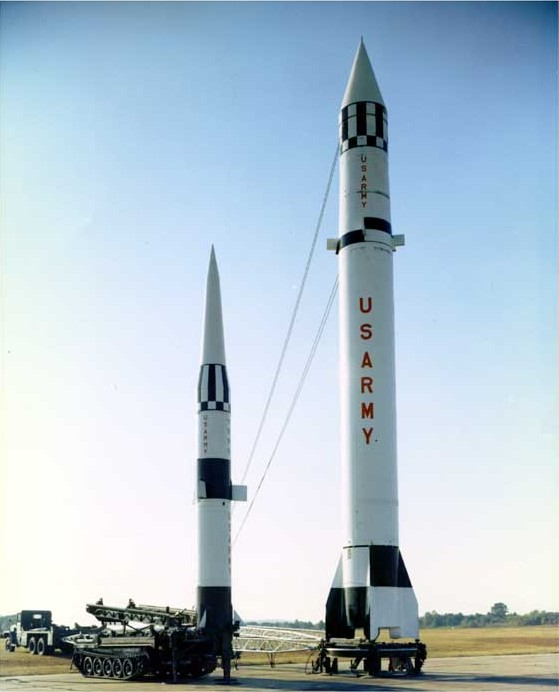
Pershing missile (34.6 feet length, 460-mile range) and Redstone missile (69.3 feet length, 201-mile range)

The Pershing 1 firing platoon consisted of four M474 tracked-vehicles manufactured by FMC Corporation— by comparison, Redstone needed twenty vehicles. The transporter erector launcher (TEL) transported the two stages and the guidance section as an assembly and provided the launch platform after the warhead was mated. It used a removable erector launcher manufactured by Unidynamics. The warhead carrier transported the warhead, the missile fins and the azimuth laying set used to position the missile. The PTS/PS carrier transported the programmer test station (PTS) and power station (PS). A fourth vehicle transported the Radio Terminal Set. The four vehicles were known as the land train.

The PTS featured rapid missile checkout and countdowns, with complete computer control, and automatic self-test and malfunction isolation. Additionally, the PTS would perform tests that simulated airborne missile operation, programmed the trajectory of the missile and controlled the firing sequence. Plug-in micromodules increased maintainability and allowed the PTS operator to perform 80% of all repairs at the firing position. A turbine driven Power Station mounted behind the PTS, provided the primary electrical and pneumatic power and conditioned air for the missile and ground support equipment at the firing position.

Collins Radio Company produced the AN/TRC-80 Radio Terminal Set specifically for the Pershing system. The "Track 80" used an inflatable dish antenna to provide line-of-sight or tropospheric-scatter voice and teleprinter communications between missile firing units and higher headquarters. The erector-launcher, PTS, PS and RTS could be removed from the carriers and air-transported in fourteen CH-47 Chinook loads.

=== Orientation ===
The missile was positioned or laid in on a pre-surveyed site with a system of two theodolites and a target card. Directional control passed from one theodolite to the one next to the missile. The missile then oriented to north by an operator using a horizontal laying theodolite aimed at a window in the guidance section of the missile. Using a control box, the ST-120 inertial navigation system in the guidance section rotated into alignment and the north direction programmed into the computer.

=== Satellite launcher ===
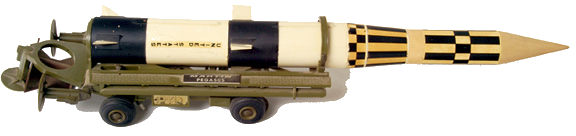
Model of the Pegasus satellite launcher system

In 1961, Martin proposed a satellite launch system based on the Pershing. Named Pegasus, it would have had a lighter, simplified guidance section and a short third stage booster. A 60-pound (27 kg) payload could be boosted to a 210-mile (340 km) circular orbit, or to an elliptical orbit with a 700-mile (1,130 km) apogee. Pegasus would have used the Pershing erector-launcher and could be placed in any open area. Martin seems to have targeted the nascent European space program, but this system was never developed.

=== APL ===
In 1965, the Army contracted with the Applied Physics Laboratory (APL) of Johns Hopkins University to develop and implement a test and evaluation program. APL provided technical support to the Pershing Operational Test Unit (POTU), identified problem areas and improved the performance and survivability of the Pershing systems.

=== Gallery ===
Pershing 1 land train

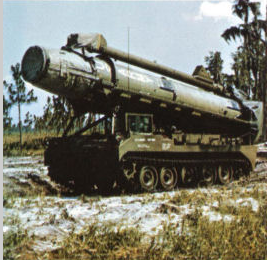
Missile carrier

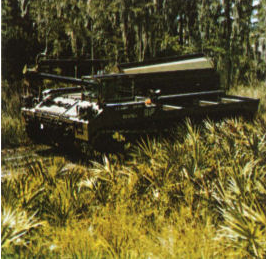
Warhead carrier

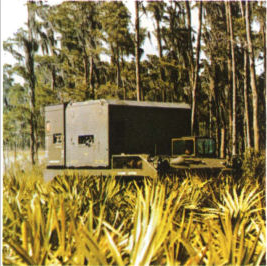
Programmer Test Station and Power station

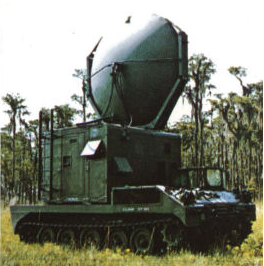
AN/TRC-80 Radio Terminal Set

== Pershing 1a ==
Pershing 1a
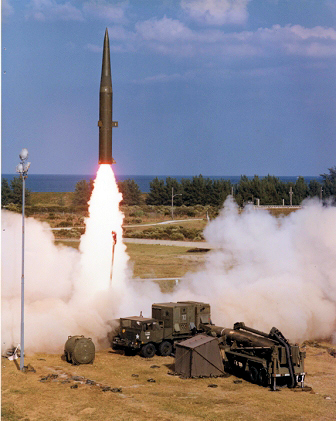
- Pershing 1a launched from the Eastern Range, Cape Canaveral Air Force Station, Launch Complex 16 by C Battery, 3rd Battalion, 84th Field Artillery on 26 October 1976
- Type: Surface-to-surface guided missile
- Place of origin: United States

Service history
- In service: 1969–1991
- Used by: United States Army 108 launchers; German Air Force 72 launchers

Production history
- Designer: Martin Marietta
- Designed: 1965–1969
- Manufacturer: Martin Marietta
- Produced: 1969
- No. built: 754 MGM-31A missiles

Specifications
- Mass: 10,275 pounds (4,661 kg)
- Length: 34.6 feet (10.5 m)
- Diameter: 40 inches (1 m)
- Blast yield: W50 nuclear warhead; 60 kilotons of TNT (0.25 PJ); 200 kilotons of TNT (0.84 PJ); 400 kilotons of TNT (1.7 PJ)
- Engine: First stage: Thiokol TX-174; 25,900 pounds-force (115 kN) 38.3 s; Second stage: Thiokol TX-175; 19,100 pounds-force (85 kN) 39 s
- Operational range: 460 miles (740 km)
- Boost time: 77.3 seconds
- Maximum speed: Mach 8
- Guidance system: Eclipse-Pioneer ST-120 inertial guidance
- Steering system: Jet vanes, air vanes
- Accuracy: 1,310 feet (400 m) circular error probable
- Launch platform: M790 erector launcher
- Transport: M757 5-ton tractor

=== Development ===
In 1964 a series of operational tests and follow-on tests were performed to determine Pershing reliability. The Secretary of Defense then requested that the Army define the modifications required to make Pershing suitable for the Quick Reaction Alert (QRA) role. The Pershing 1a development program was approved in 1965, the original Pershing renamed to Pershing 1 and Martin Marietta received the Pershing 1a production contract in 1967. Project SWAP replaced all the Pershing equipment in Germany by mid-1970 and the first units quickly achieved QRA status. Secretary of Defense Robert McNamara directed that the U.S. Air Force's MGM-13 Mace missile would be replaced by the Pershing 1a in 1965.

Pershing 1a was a Quick Reaction Alert system and so had faster vehicles, launch times and newer electronics. The total number of launchers increased from 8 to 36 per battalion. Production of the Pershing 1a missile ended in 1975 and reopened in 1977 to replace missiles expended in training.

Pershing 1a was further improved in 1971 with the Pershing Missile and Power Station Development Program. The analog guidance computer and the control computer in the missile were replaced by a single digital guidance and control computer. The main distributor in the missile that routed power and signals was replaced with a new version. The missile used a rotary inverter to convert DC to AC that was replaced by a solid-state static inverter. The power station was improved for accessibility and maintenance. Further improvements in 1976 allowed the firing of a platoon's three missiles in quick succession and from any site without the need for surveying. The Automatic Reference System (ARS) used an optical laser link and a north-seeking gyro with encode to eliminate the need for pre-selected and surveyed points. The Sequential Launch Adapter connected the PTS to three missiles, eliminating the need to cable and uncable each launcher.

A total of 754 MGM-31A missiles were built.

=== Deployment ===
The battalions in Europe reorganized under a new table of organization and equipment (TOE); an infantry battalion was added to provide additional security; and the 56th Artillery Group was reorganized and redesignated the 56th Field Artillery Brigade. Due to the nature of the weapon system, officer positions were increased by one grade: batteries were commanded by a major instead of a captain; battalions were commanded by a colonel; and the brigade was commanded by a brigadier general.

Pershing 1a was deployed with three U.S. battalions in Europe and two German Air Force wings. Each battalion or wing had 36 mobile launchers. The constitution of West Germany prohibited owning nuclear weapons, thus control of the nuclear warheads remained in the hands of the U.S. Army. During peacetime operations, a portion of the Pershing 1a assets were deployed on the QRA mission. The remainder would be conducting field training or were maintained in kasernes awaiting alert. The system was designed to be highly mobile, permitting its dispersal to clandestine sites in times of alert or war and was deployed at distances greater than 100 km behind the forward edge of battle area or political border. Owing to its mobility and setback, Pershing was considered one of the most survivable theater nuclear weapons ever deployed in Europe.

The primary mission in the Supreme Allied Commander, Europe scheduled plan took one of two forms: peacetime or an increased state of readiness called the period of tension. Different levels or techniques of tasking were used for these mission forms. The peacetime Quick Reaction Alert role required that for each battalion or wing, one firing battery or a portion thereof would be combat alert status (CAS) on a permanent hard site, covering assigned targets.

In peacetime the four batteries of each battalion rotated through four states or conditions of alert readiness, the highest being that of the CAS battery. The purpose of this rotation was to assume the CAS status, to share the burden of CAS responsibility, to provide time for field tactical training and equipment maintenance, and to give ample leave and pass time to personnel without adverse impact on operational requirements.

During periods of increased tension, the firing batteries of each battalion were deployed to previously unused field tactical sites. At these sites, they assumed responsibility for coverage of all assigned targets. During the transition from the peacetime to full combat status, coverage was maintained on the highest priority targets that were assigned to the peacetime CAS batteries.

Once all firing batteries were at their field sites, the firing elements of the battalions were deployed by platoons, which were then separated from each other geographically to reduce vulnerability. The platoons then moved to new firing positions on a random schedule to increase survivability.

=== Launcher and support equipment ===
The M790 erector launcher (EL) was a modified low-boy flat-bed trailer towed by a Ford M757 5-ton tractor. The erection booms used a 3,000 psi pneumatic over hydraulic system that could erect the five ton missile from horizontal to vertical in nine seconds. Due to the overall missile length and for security, the warhead was not mated during travel. It was stored in a carrier and mated using a hand-pumped davit after the launcher was emplaced. The EL was pulled by a Ford M757 tractor for U.S. Army units and by a Magirus-Deutz Jupiter 6×6 for German Air Force units.

The PTS and PS were mounted on a Ford M656 truck for U.S. Army units and a Magirus-Deutz or MAN 630 for German Air Force units. Launch activation was performed from a remote fire box that could be deployed locally or mounted in the battery control central (BCC). One PTS controlled three launchers— when one launch count was complete, ten large cables were unplugged from the PTS and the PTS was moved up and connected to the next launcher.

=== Further improvements ===
Missile and power station upgrades in 1974 provided easier access to missile components, reduce maintenance and improved reliability. A new digital guidance and control computer combined the functions of the analog control computer and the analog guidance computer into one package. The mean time to repair decreased from 8.7 hours to 3.8 hours and the mean time between failures increased from 32 hours to 65 hours.

More modifications in 1976 greatly reduced the launch time. The sequential launch adapter (SLA) was an automatic switching device mounted in a 10-ton trailer that allowed the PTS to remain connected to all three launchers allowing all three missiles to stay hot. The automatic reference system (ARS) eliminated the theodolites previously used to lay and orient the missile. It included a north-seeking gyro and a laser link to the ST-120 that more quickly oriented the missile.

After the Pershing II explosion in 1985, the Pershing 1a launchers of the German Air Force were retrofitted with ballistic shields.

In 1987 a joint Army/Department of Energy study concluded that it was technically and financially feasible to replace the W50 warhead carried by Pershing 1a with the W85 warhead developed for Pershing II. However, with the signing of the INF Treaty, development on the conversion was terminated.

=== Gallery ===
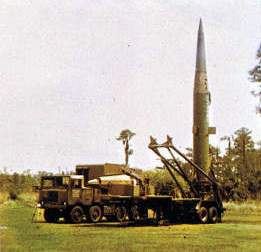
Pershing 1a missile system

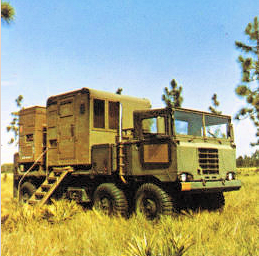
Programmer Test Station and Power station

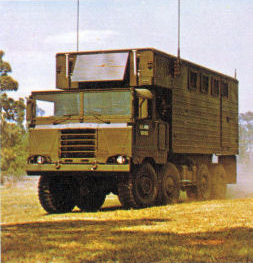
Battery Control Central

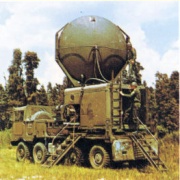
AN/TRC-80 Radio Terminal Set

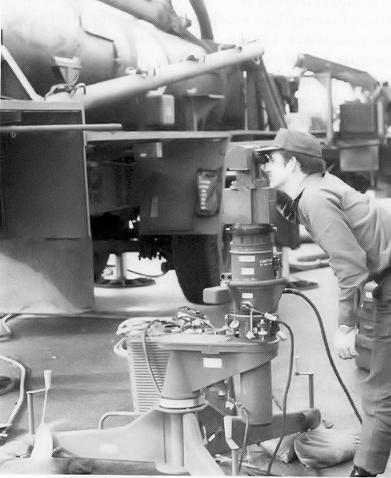
Azimuth Reference System

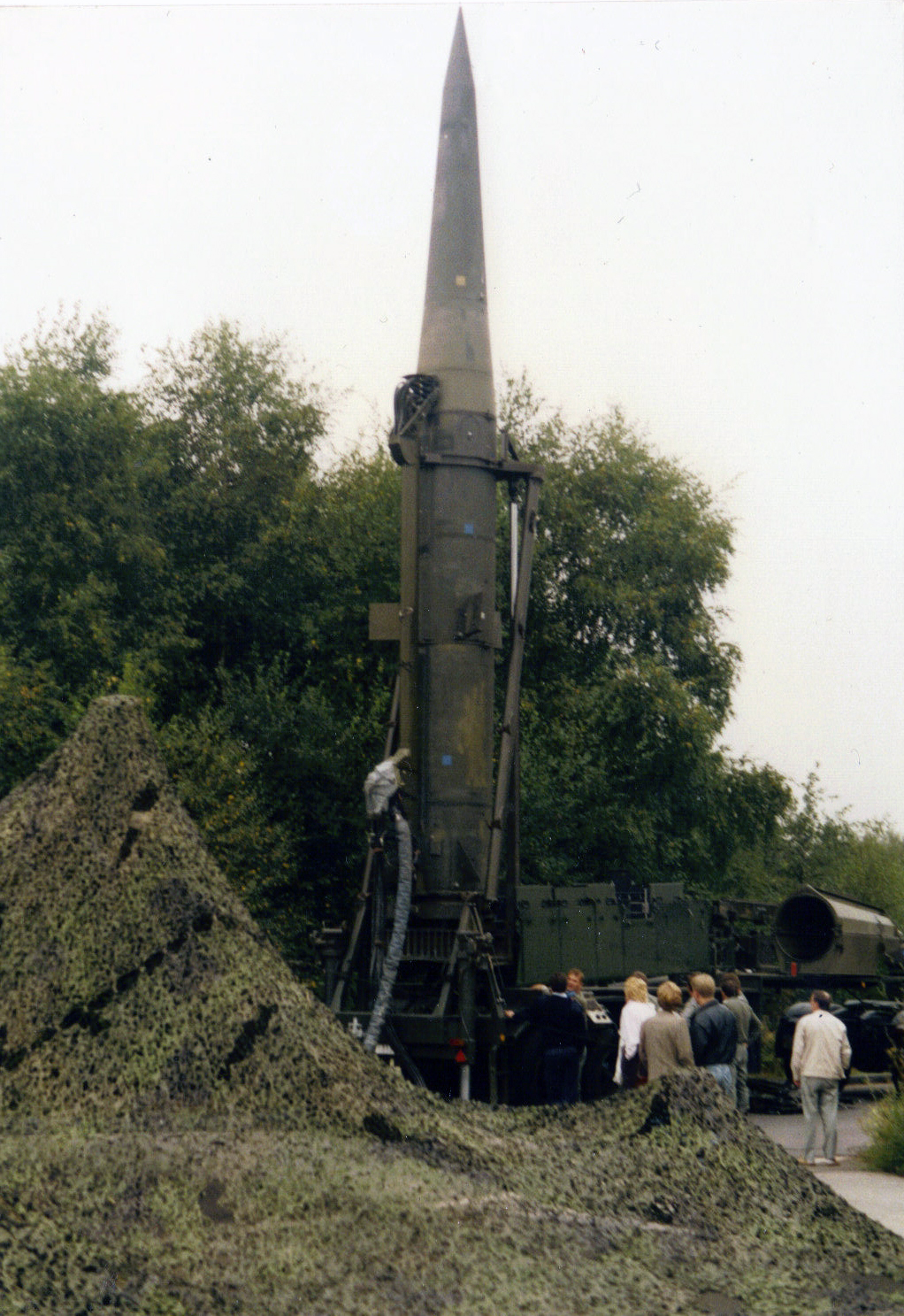
West German Erector Launcher with ballistic shields

== Pershing II ==
The Pershing II Weapon System was a solid-fueled two-stage ballistic missile designed and built by Martin Marietta to replace the Pershing 1a Field Artillery Missile System as the United States Army's primary nuclear-capable theater-level weapon. The U.S. Army replaced the Pershing 1a with the Pershing II in 1983 while the German Air Force retained Pershing 1a until all Pershings were eliminated in 1991.

== Operators ==
United States: United States Army

- 56th Artillery Group (1963–1970), 56th Artillery Brigade (1970–1972), 56th Field Artillery Brigade (1972–1986)
  - 1st Missile Battalion, 81st Artillery Regiment (1963–1972), 1st Battalion, 81st Field Artillery Regiment (1972–1986)
  - 3rd Missile Battalion, 84th Artillery Regiment (1963–1968), 3rd Battalion, 84th Field Artillery Regiment (1968–1986)
  - 4th Missile Battalion, 41st Artillery Regiment (1963–1971), 1st Missile Battalion, 41st Artillery Regiment (1971–1972), 1st Battalion, 41st Field Artillery Regiment (1972–1986)
- 214th Artillery Group (1958–1972), 214th Field Artillery Group (1972–1979), 214th Field Artillery Brigade (1979–1991)
  - 2nd Missile Battalion, 44th Artillery Regiment (1962–1971), 3rd Battalion, 9th Field Artillery Regiment (1971–1990)
- 1st Field Artillery Missile Brigade
  - 2nd Missile Battalion, 79th Artillery Regiment (1964–1968)

West Germany: German Air Force

- Missile Wing 1 (German: Flugkörpergeschwader 1)
  - Missile Group 12 (German: Flugkörpergruppe 12)
  - Missile Group 13 (German: Flugkörpergruppe 13)
- Missile Wing 2 (German: Flugkörpergeschwader 2)
  - Missile Group 21 (German: Flugkörpergruppe 21)
  - Missile Group 22 (German: Flugkörpergruppe 22)

== Elimination ==
The Pershing systems were eliminated after the ratification of the Intermediate-Range Nuclear Forces Treaty on 27 May 1988. The missiles began to be withdrawn in October 1988 and the last of the missiles were destroyed by the static burn of their motors and subsequently crushed in May 1991 at the Longhorn Army Ammunition Plant near Caddo Lake, Texas. Although not covered by the treaty, West Germany agreed unilaterally to the removal of the Pershing 1a missiles from its inventory in 1991, and the missiles were destroyed in the United States.
