= 9th Field Artillery Regiment =

- Coat of arms
- Active: 1916
- Country: (United States)
- Branch: United States Army
- Type: Field artillery
- Role: USARS parent regiment
- Size: regiment
- Part of: 2nd Brigade Combat Team, 3rd Infantry Division
- Home station: Fort Stewart, GA
- Patron: Saint Barbara
- Motto: Kulia-i-ka-nuu (Hawaiian meaning "Strive to Reach the Summit.")

Insignia
- Distinctive unit insignia

The 9th Field Artillery Regiment is a field artillery regiment of the United States Army first formed in 1916. The regiment served in Hawaii during World War I, 3rd, 4th, 7th, and 9th Divisions between the world wars, and with 3rd Infantry Division during World War II and Korea. Since 1957, the regiment has been a parent regiment under the Combat Arms Regimental System and the U.S. Army Regimental System, with regimental elements serving with the 3rd, 4th, 10th, 25th, 79th, 83rd, and 96th Infantry Divisions and various field artillery brigades and groups. The regiment's single active component, the 1st Battalion, 9th Field Artillery Regiment, is assigned to the 2nd Brigade Combat Team, 3rd Infantry Division and stationed at Fort Stewart, Georgia.

== Current status of regimental elements ==
- 1st Battalion, 9th Field Artillery Regiment - active, assigned to the 2nd Brigade Combat Team, 3rd Infantry Division
- 2nd Battalion, 9th Field Artillery Regiment - inactive since 25 February 1991
- 3rd Battalion, 9th Field Artillery Regiment - inactive since 15 June 1996
- 4th Battalion, 9th Field Artillery Regiment - inactive since 15 August 1990
- 5th Battalion, 9th Field Artillery Regiment - inactive since 15 February 1963
- 6th Battalion, 9th Field Artillery Regiment - inactive since 1 October 1983
- 7th Battalion, 9th Field Artillery Regiment - inactive since 1 September 1995

== History ==
The 9th Field Artillery Regiment was formed from elements of the 1st Field Artillery Regiment in Hawaii in 1916. By 1919, the regiment was stationed at Fort Sill, Oklahoma. The regiment was inactivated there on 1 September 1921. Although the regimental headquarters was inactive from 1921 through 1927, the regiment's 1st Battalion was active from 1922 to 1927, with elements at Fort Des Moines, Iowa and Fort Riley, Kansas. Although inactive, the regiment was reassigned from the 7th Division to the 9th Division in 1927. The regiment was reorganized as a 75mm gun regiment in 1927 in the Seventh Corps Area, and Organized Reserve personnel assigned to the unit trained at Camp McCoy, Wisconsin in 1927 and at Fort Riley, Kansas in 1928–9. In 1930, the regiment was allotted to the Fourth Corps Area, reassigned from the 9th Division to the 4th Division, and changed into a motorized 155mm howitzer unit, but never organized in the Fourth Corps Area. The regiment's 1st Battalion was activated in 1930 at Fort Lewis, Washington. In 1933, the regiment was withdrawn from the Fourth Corps Area and allotted to the 9th Corps Area, and reassigned from the 4th Division to the 3rd Division. The regiment's 2nd Battalion was activated in 1939, joining the 1st Battalion at Fort Lewis. The 3rd Battalion was disbanded in 1939 (apparently without ever being organized). On 1 October 1940, the regiment was reorganized as the 9th Field Artillery Battalion as part of the Army's conversion to triangular divisions which eliminated field artillery regiments from the force structure in favor of independent battalions.

=== World War II ===
The 9th Field Artillery Battalion departed Hampton Roads Port of Embarkation, Hampton Roads, Virginia, on 27 October 1942, and landed in North Africa on 8 November 1942 as part of Operation Torch. As the division artillery's 155mm general support unit, one battery of the battalion landed with each regimental landing group.

In January 1944, the 9th FA was in Quiliano in Italy and later rest near Naples.

Section Under Development

=== Korea ===
Section Under Development

== Further service by regimental elements ==
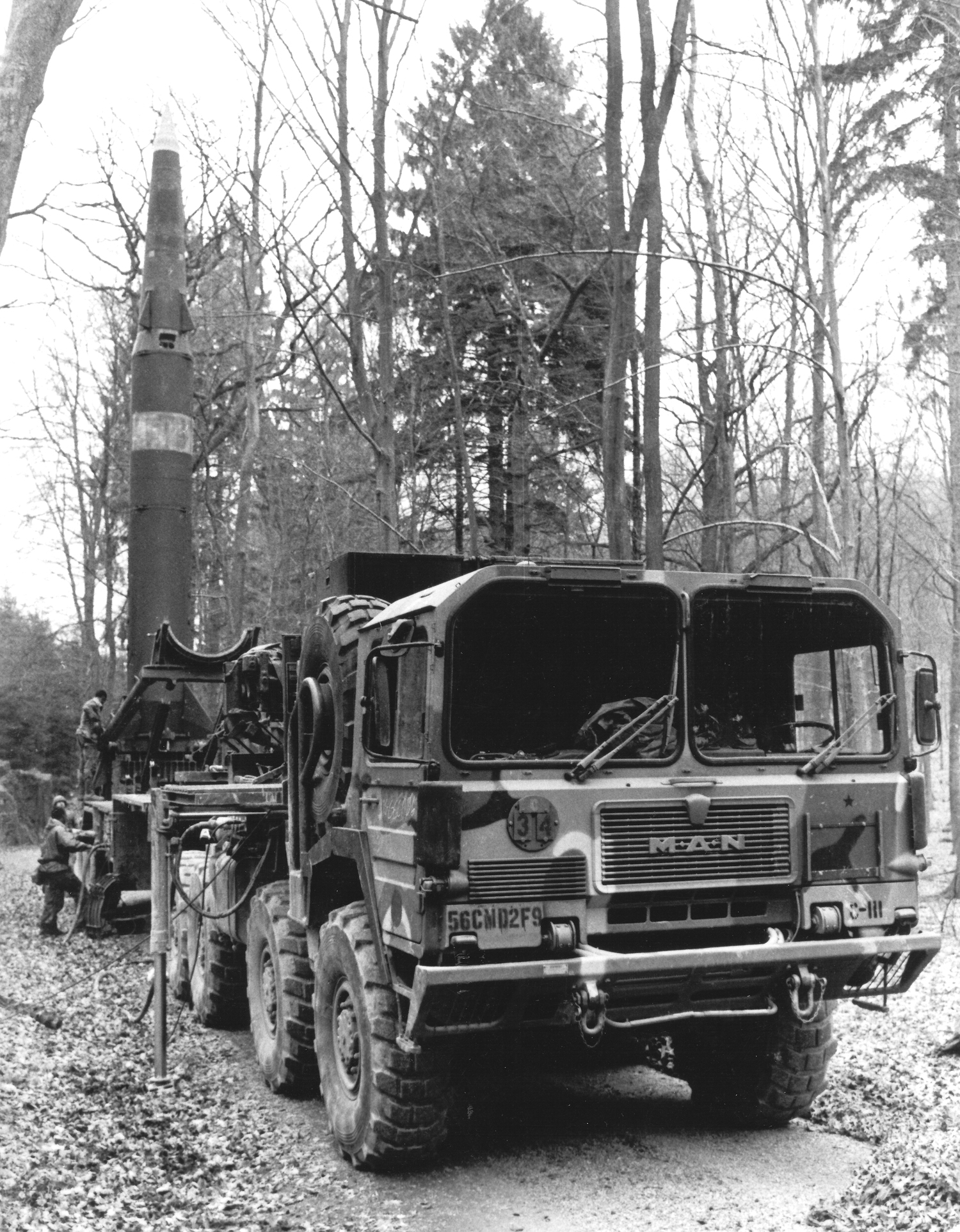
Pershing II of 2nd Battalion, 9th Field Artillery

- The 1st Battalion, 9th Field Artillery Regiment served with the 3rd Infantry Division from 1957 to 1971. The battalion was reactivated as a Pershing missile battalion in the 56th Field Artillery Command from 1986 to 1991. The battalion was reassigned to the 3rd Infantry Division and reactivated by reflagging the 3rd Battalion, 41st Field Artillery Regiment at Fort Stewart Georgia. The battalion has deployed multiple times to Iraq and Afghanistan as part of the Global War on Terror.
- The 2nd Battalion, 9th Field Artillery Regiment served with the 10th Infantry Division in Germany and at Fort Benning, Georgia, from 1958 to 1960; with the 25th Infantry Division at Schofield Barracks and in Vietnam from 1960 to 1967 and 1970–1972; with the 4th Infantry Division in Vietnam and Fort Lewis, Washington, from 1967 to 1970. The battalion was reactivated as a Pershing missile battalion in the 56th Field Artillery Command from 1986 to 1991.
- The 3rd Battalion, 9th Field Artillery Regiment served in the Army Reserve's 83rd Infantry Division from 1959 to 1965 and at Fort Sill, Oklahoma, from 1971 to 1996.
- The 4th Battalion, 9th Field Artillery Regiment served in the Army Reserve's 79th Infantry Division from 1959 to 1963. The battalion was reactivated as a Pershing missile battalion in the 56th Field Artillery Command from 1986 to 1990.
- The 5th Battalion, 9th Field Artillery Regiment served in the Army Reserve's 96th Infantry Division from 1959 to 1963.
- The 6th Battalion, 9th Field Artillery Regiment served at Fort Sill, Oklahoma, from 1963 to 1983.
- The 7th Battalion, 9th Field Artillery Regiment served at Fort Irwin, California, and in Vietnam from 1966 to 1970, and with the Army Reserve in New York and Florida from 1971 to 1995.

=== Pershing ===
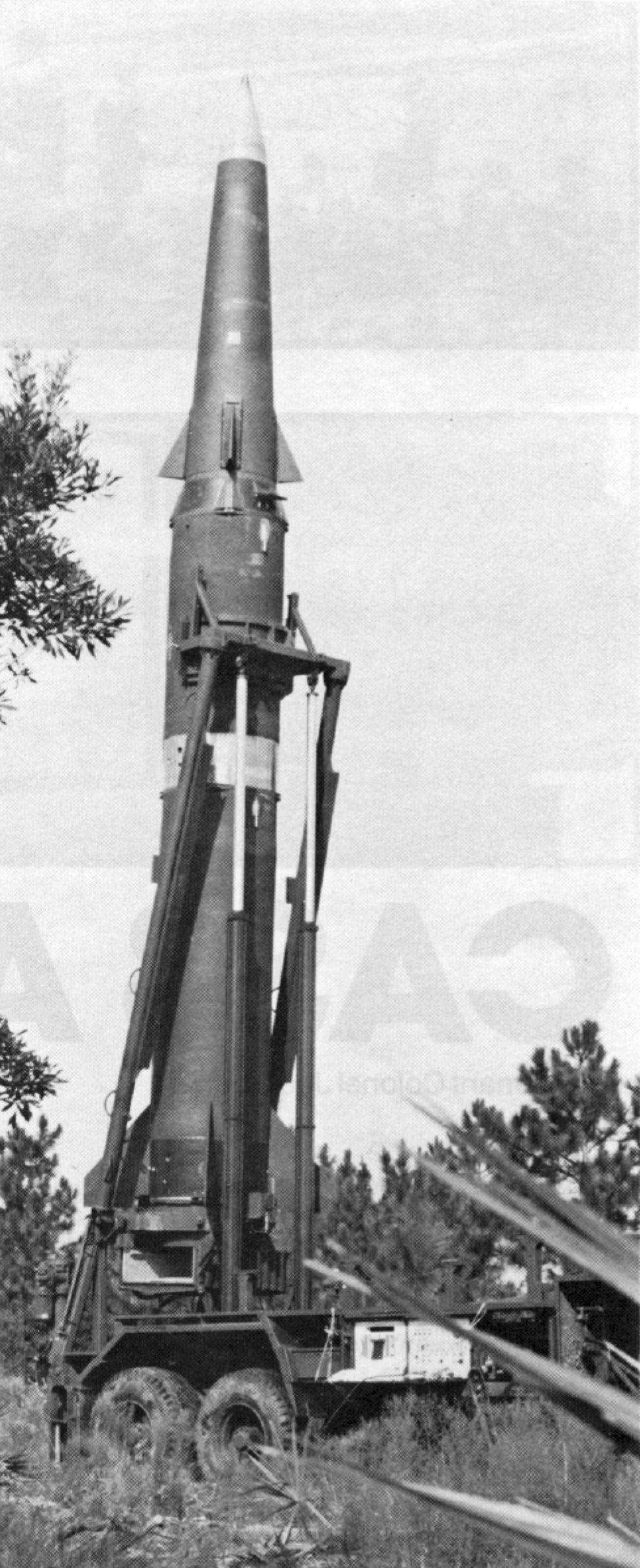
Pershing II on an erector launcher, 9th FA.

==== 1st Battalion, 9th Field Artillery Regiment ====
The 56th Field Artillery Brigade in West Germany reorganized in January 1986 and was redesignated as the 56th Field Artillery Command. 1st Battalion, 81st Field Artillery Regiment was inactivated and reformed as 1st Battalion, 9th Field Artillery Regiment in Neu-Ulm. With the ratification of the Intermediate-Range Nuclear Forces Treaty on 27 May 1988 the missiles were destroyed and the battalion was inactivated on 30 June 1991.

===== Commanders =====
- 1986: Lt. Col. Herbert W. Reichert
- December 1988: Lt. Col. Robert P. Shadburn
- 1989: Lt. Col. Stephen Seay

==== 2nd Battalion, 9th Field Artillery Regiment ====
The 56th Field Artillery Brigade in West Germany reorganized in January 1986 and was redesignated as the 56th Field Artillery Command. 1st Battalion, 41st Field Artillery Regiment was inactivated and reformed as 2nd Battalion, 9th Field Artillery Regiment in Schwäbisch Gmünd. With the ratification of the Intermediate-Range Nuclear Forces Treaty on 27 May 1988 the missiles were destroyed and the battalion was inactivated on 25 February 1991.

===== Commanders =====
- 1986: Lt. Col. David E. Bonner
- December 1988: Lt. Col. Michael J. Pasquarett

==== 3rd Battalion, 9th Field Artillery Regiment ====
The 2nd Missile Battalion, 44th Artillery Regiment was activated at Fort Sill, Oklahoma, as the first Pershing missile unit under the 9th Field Artillery Missile Group. On 1 September 1971 it was inactivated and reformed as the 3rd Battalion, 9th Field Artillery Regiment. As the only Pershing field artillery unit in the continental United States, their mission was to test new equipment and procedures, support the Field Artillery School, support missile firings at White Sands Missile Range and the off-range launch sites and at Cape Canaveral. On 5 July 1979, the 3 missile battalions of the 9th Field Artillery Missile Group were reassigned to the 214th Field Artillery Group, which was redesignated as the 214th Field Artillery Brigade on 16 September 1979. With the ratification of the Intermediate-Range Nuclear Forces Treaty on 27 May 1988 the missiles were destroyed and the battalion was inactivated on 15 June 1996.

Commanders:

- 1985: Lt. Col L. Kirk Lewis
- 1986: Lt. Col Jeffrey L. Wishik
- 1988: Lt. Col Eugene A. McKenzie

==== 4th Battalion, 9th Field Artillery Regiment ====
The 56th Field Artillery Brigade in West Germany reorganized in January 1986 and was redesignated as the 56th Field Artillery Command. 3rd Battalion, 84th Field Artillery Regiment was inactivated and reformed as 4th Battalion, 9th Field Artillery Regiment in Heilbronn. With the ratification of the Intermediate-Range Nuclear Forces Treaty on 27 May 1988 the missiles were destroyed and the battalion was inactivated on 15 August 1990.

===== Commanders =====
- 1986: Lt. Col. Douglas E. Taylor
- December 1988: Lt. Col. Frank L. Varsolona

== Lineage and honors ==
=== Lineage ===
- Constituted 1 July 1916 in the Regular Army as the 9th Field Artillery
- Organized 6 August 1916 at Schofield Barracks, Territory of Hawaii
- Inactivated 1 September 1921 at Fort Sill, Oklahoma

(1st and 2d Battalions activated 1 October 1922 at Fort Des Moines, Iowa, and Fort Sill, Oklahoma, respectively; 2d Battalion inactivated 31 December 1922 at Fort Sill, Oklahoma)

- Assigned 24 March 1923 to the 7th Division
- Relieved 15 August 1927 from assignment to the 7th Division and assigned to the 9th Division

(1st Battalion consolidated 15 September 1927 with the 2d Battalion, 18th Field Artillery, and consolidated unit designated as the 2d Battalion, 18th Field Artillery - hereafter separate lineage; new 1st Battalion concurrently constituted)

- Relieved 1 January 1930 from assignment to the 9th Division and assigned to the 4th Division (3d Battalion concurrently constituted)

(1st Battalion activated 30 April 1930 at Fort Lewis, Washington)

- Relieved 1 October 1933 from assignment to the 4th Division and assigned to the 3d Division (later redesignated as the 3d Infantry Division)

(2d Battalion activated 1 May-12 October 1939 at Fort Lewis, Washington)

- Reorganized and redesignated 1 October 1940 as the 9th Field Artillery Battalion
- Relieved 1 September 1950 from assignment to the 3d Infantry Division
- Reassigned 17 January 1951 to the 3d Infantry Division
- Relieved 1 July 1957 from assignment to the 3d Infantry Division; concurrently reorganized and redesignated as the 9th Artillery, a parent regiment under the Combat Arms Regimental System
- Redesignated 1 September 1971 as the 9th Field Artillery
- Withdrawn 17 January 1986 from the Combat Arms Regimental System and reorganized under the United States Army Regimental System
- Redesignated 1 October 2005 as the 9th Field Artillery Regiment

=== Campaign participation credit ===
- World War II: Algeria-French Morocco (with arrowhead); Tunisia; Sicily (with arrowhead); Naples-Foggia; Anzio (with arrowhead); Rome-Arno; Southern France (with arrowhead); Rhineland; Ardennes-Alsace; Central Europe
- Korean War: UN Defensive; UN Offensive; CCF Intervention; First UN Counteroffensive; CCF Spring Offensive; UN Summer-Fall Offensive; Second Korean Winter; Korea, Summer-Fall 1952; Third Korean Winter; Korea, Summer 1953
- Vietnam: Counteroffensive; Counteroffensive, Phase II; Counteroffensive, Phase III; Tet Counteroffensive; Counteroffensive, Phase IV; Counteroffensive, Phase V; Counteroffensive, Phase VI; Tet 69/Counteroffensive; Summer-Fall 1969; Winter-Spring 1970

=== Decorations ===
- Presidential Unit Citation (Army) for COLMAR
- Valorous Unit Award for QUANG NGAI PROVINCE
- Army Superior Unit Award for 1986
- French Croix de Guerre with Palm, World War II for COLMAR
- French Croix de Guerre, World War II, Fourragere
- Republic of Korea Presidential Unit Citation for UIJONGBU CORRIDOR
- Republic of Korea Presidential Unit Citation for IRON TRIANGLE
- Chryssoun Aristion Andrias (Bravery Gold Medal of Greece) for KOREA

== Heraldry ==

=== Distinctive unit insignia ===
Description: A Gold color metal and enamel device 1 9/32 inches (3.3 cm) in height consisting of a shield blazoned: Gules two puloulou palewise Proper (a ball Argent on a staff Sable), on a canton Or a stand of grape shot Proper (for the 1st Field Artillery).

Symbolism: The 9th Field Artillery Regiment (parent organization of the 9th Field Artillery Battalion) was organized in 1916 in Hawaii from the 1st Field Artillery. This descent is shown by the stand of grape shot in the canton, taken from the coat of arms of the 1st Field Artillery, which commemorates General Taylor's famous remark to the battery commander in the old regiment at Buena Vista, "A little more grape, Captain Bragg." The place of origin and first station of the 9th Field Artillery Regiment are depicted in the remainder of the arms: The shield is red for Artillery. The two Hawaiian puloulou—a blackstaff with a white ball—were ancient emblems of the country and were placed on each side of the gateway to the king's quarters.

Background: The distinctive unit insignia was originally approved for the 9th Field Artillery Regiment on 6 November 1922. It was amended to change the method of wear on 12 December 1923. The insignia was amended again on 7 January 1924 and 10 January 1925. It was amended to change the wear again on 16 July 1925. It was redesignated for the 9th Field Artillery Battalion on 23 December 1942. It was again redesignated for the 9th Artillery Regiment on 22 January 1958. The insignia was redesignated for the 9th Field Artillery Regiment effective 1 September 1971.

=== Coat of arms ===

Description/Blazon

- Shield: Gules two puloulou palewise Proper (a ball Argent on a staff Sable), on a canton Or a stand of grape shot Proper (for the 1st Field Artillery).
- Symbolism: The 9th Field Artillery Regiment (parent organization of the 9th Field Artillery Battalion) was organized in 1916 in Hawaii from the 1st Field Artillery. This descent is shown by the stand of grape shot in the canton, taken from the coat of arms of the 1st Field Artillery, which commemorates General Taylor's famous remark to the battery commander in the old regiment at Buena Vista, "A little more grape, Captain Bragg." The place of origin and first station of the 9th Field Artillery Regiment are depicted in the remainder of the arms: The shield is red for Artillery. The two Hawaiian puloulou—a blackstaff with a white ball—were ancient emblems of the country and were placed on each side of the gateway to the king's quarters.

Crest: On a wreath of the colors, Or and Gules, an alia (crossed Hawaiian spears) supporting a puela with nine plumes, five of Gold and four of Silver, Gold and Silver alternating (the flag of the Hawaiian Chief) all Proper.

Symbolism: The crest is an alia, the two crossed spears which were placed in front of the king's house. The puela, the duster-like flag of the king, is drawn with nine plumes, five gold and four silver, indicating the number of the organization.

Background: The coat of arms was originally approved for the 9th Field Artillery Regiment on 19 October 1921. It was amended to change the blazon of the crest on 15 December 1922. It was redesignated for the 9th Field Artillery Battalion on 23 December 1942. It was redesignated for the 9th Artillery Regiment on 22 January 1958. The insignia was amended to change the translation of the motto on 26 February 1965. The coat of arms was redesignated effective 1 September 1971 for the 9th Field Artillery Regiment.

- Superior Unit Award, awarded to 1st, 2nd and 4th battalions for the period of 17 January 1986 – 21 December 1986.

== See also ==
- Field Artillery Branch (United States)
- 56th Field Artillery Command
- 3rd Infantry Division (United States)
- 3rd Infantry Division Artillery (United States)
