= Pershing missile bibliography =

This Pershing missile bibliography is a list of works related to the Pershing 1 and Pershing 1a Field Artillery Missile Systems and the Pershing II Weapon System.

== Books ==
- Bergaust, Erik (1966). Rockets of the Armed Forces. New York: G.P. Putnam's Sons.
- Burns, Steven T. (2014). History of the Pershing Missile Systems. BookPatch.com. ISBN 978-1-63318-129-8.
- Caldicott, Helen (1984). Missile Envy: The Arms Race & Nuclear War. William Morrow. ISBN 978-0-688-01954-9.
- Chant, Christopher; Hogg, Ian (1983). The Nuclear War File: Weaponry, Strategy, Flashpoints, the Balance of Power. London: Ebury Press. ISBN 978-0-85223-380-1.
- Colbourn, Susan (2022). Euromissiles: The Nuclear Weapons That Nearly Destroyed NATO. Ithaca, New York: Cornell University Press. ISBN 978-1501766022.
- Dartford, Mark (1985). Military Technology. Exeter Books. ISBN 0-671-07575-6.
- Depew, Doug (24 February 2011). SAT & BAF!: Memories of a Tower Rat. Outskirts Press. ISBN 978-1-4327-7132-4.
- Enscore, Susan I.; Webster, Julie L.; Fike, Angela M.; Stupich, Martin J. (December 2008). Level II Documentation of Launch Complex 31/32, Cape Canaveral Air Force Station, Florida. United States Army Corps of Engineers.
- Harahan, Joseph P. (1993). On-Site Inspections under the INF Treaty: A History of the On-Site Inspection Agency and INF Treaty Implementation, 1988-1991 (PDF). Government Printing Office. ISBN 0-16-041719-8.
- Hardecker, Dana (8 June 2018). Bark! You Delta Dogs: The Making of US Army Nuclear Soldier. Christian Faith Publishing. ISBN 978-1-64299-056-0.
- Harwood, William B. (1993). Raise Heaven and Earth. Simon & Schuster. ISBN 978-0-671-74998-9.
- Herf, Jeffrey (1991). War by Other Means: Soviet Power, West German Resistance, and the Battle of the Euromissiles. The Free Press. ISBN 978-0-02-915030-6.
- Laurence, Martin (1987). "Pershing II" (PDF). The Changing Face of Nuclear Warfare. Ilex. ISBN 978-0-06-096150-3.
- Quint, Peter (2008). Civil Disobedience and the German Courts: the Pershing Missile Protests in Comparative Perspective. Routledge-Cavendish. ISBN 978-1-134-10741-4.
- Reed, John Jr. (1987). Germany and NATO. Washington, D.C.: National Defense University Press. ISBN 0-7881-2157-X.
- Stein, Barry Jason (1993). U.S. Army Heraldic Crests: A Complete Illustrated History of Authorized Distinctive Unit Insignia. University of South Carolina Press. p. 364. ISBN 0-87249-963-4.
- Taylor, John W. R. (1962). "Pershing". Rockets and Missiles (PDF). Hippo Books. Longacre Press. pp. 64–65.
- Ulin, Robert R. (2011). Witness to History: Reflections of a Cold War Soldier. Merlin Press. ISBN 978-1-4567-3615-6.
- White, Andrew (1983). Symbols of War: Pershing II and Cruise Missiles in Europe. London: AuthorHouse. ISBN 978-0-85036-320-3.

== Martin / Martin Marietta ==
- Pershing: The Man, the Missile, the Mission (PDF). The Martin Company. 1960. WSS 009.
- Pershing (PDF). The Martin Company. October 1963. OA1754.
- U.S. Army Pershing Weapon System (PDF). Martin Marietta. May 1969. OR 6957-B/2.
- Hull, Larry (1973). Pershing: A Decade of Service (PDF). The Martin Company. OR 10.596B.
- Pershing Ia System Description (PDF). Martin Marietta. June 1974. OR 13,149.
- ARS/SLA Acceptance (PDF). Martin Marietta. 24 October 1975.
- Pershing Ia Operational Scenario (PDF). Martin Marietta. September 1976.
- Pershing II System Description (PDF). Martin Marietta. OA 9608.
- Pershing II Weapon System Hardware Summary (PDF). Martin Marietta. June 1982.
- Pershing II (PDF). Martin Marietta. 1980. OR11597 B-80.
- "The Pershing Missile: Peace Through Strength". Lockheed Martin. 2012.
- Pershing Family (PDF) (Stencil). Martin Marietta.
- Summary Report, Pershing Weapon System, Modified Wild T-2 Theodolite Limited Test (PDF). Martin Marietta. February 1963. OR-3177. Archived from the original (PDF) on 2 May 2019.

== Bendix ==
- Brett, Daniel; Hardman, George; Ratycz, Rostyslaw (January 1964). Pershing: ST-120 Stabilizing Platform Familiarization (PDF). Teterboro, New Jersey: Bendix.

== Burroughs ==
- Burroughs D84 Modular Integrated Circuit Military Computer (PDF). Burroughs. 1 October 1965. DS684.
- D84 Modular Computer System (PDF) (Data sheet). Burroughs. 18 February 1965. D676-29M.
- Trade Show Exhibition Featuring Military Systems (Photo). Burroughs. 27 October 1965. cb000382 – via University of Minnesota Libraries, Charles Babbage Institute.
- Trade show exhibition featuring the D84 (Photo). Burroughs. 1965. cb000383 – via University of Minnesota Libraries, Charles Babbage Institute.

== US Army ==
=== Lineage and honors ===
- "56th Field Artillery Command: Shoulder Sleeve Insignia". United States Army Institute of Heraldry.
- "56th Field Artillery Command: Distinctive Unit Insignia". United States Army Institute of Heraldry. Archived from the original on 23 June 2020.
- "41st Field Artillery Regiment: Shoulder Sleeve Insignia; Distinctive Unit Insignia". United States Army Institute of Heraldry.
- "81st Field Artillery Regiment: Shoulder Sleeve Insignia; Distinctive Unit Insignia". United States Army Institute of Heraldry. Archived from the original on 4 June 2016.
- "84th Field Artillery Regiment: Shoulder Sleeve Insignia; Distinctive Unit Insignia". United States Army Institute of Heraldry.
- "9th Field Artillery Regiment: Shoulder Sleeve Insignia; Distinctive Unit Insignia". United States Army Institute of Heraldry. Archived from the original on 4 June 2016.
- "55th Maintenance Battalion: Shoulder Sleeve Insignia; Distinctive Unit Insignia". United States Army Institute of Heraldry. Archived from the original on 3 January 2016.
- "4th Infantry Regiment: Shoulder Sleeve Insignia; Distinctive Unit Insignia". United States Army Institute of Heraldry. Archived from the original on 4 June 2016.
- "Army Superior Unit Award" (PDF). US Army. 1 April 1987. DAGO 87-09. Archived from the original (PDF) on 22 December 2017. (3rd Ordnance Battalion, 56th Field Artillery Command)
- "Army Superior Unit Award" (PDF). US Army. 1 July 1987. DAGO 87-30. (56th Field Artillery Command amendment)
- "Army Superior Unit Award" (PDF). US Army. 30 December 1992. p. 10. DAGO 92-34. (Pershing Project Manager's Office)
- "Award of Pershing Professional Badge" (PDF). United States Army, 56th Field Artillery Group. 6 December 1968. 56th Artillery Group Reg 672-3.
- "History Card, 56th Coast Artillery, 56th Coast Artillery Brigade, 56th Antiaircraft Artillery Brigade, 56th Artillery Brigade, 56th Field Artillery Brigade, 56th Field Artillery Command" (PDF). United States Army. 30 September 1991. WD AGO Form 016.
- "Lineage and Honors: 9th Field Artillery Regiment". US Army. Archived from the original on 21 April 2008.
- "Lineage and Honors: 1st Battalion, 9th Field Artillery Regiment". US Army. Archived from the original on 21 April 2008.
- "Lineage and Honors: 41st Field Artillery Regiment". US Army. Archived from the original on 18 April 2012.
- "Lineage and Honors: 1st Battalion, 41st Field Artillery Regiment". US Army. Archived from the original on 18 April 2012.
- "Lineage and Honors: 38th Signal Battalion". US Army.
- "Lineage and Honors: 55th Transportation Battalion" (PDF). US Army Transportation Corps. Archived from the original (PDF) on 15 March 2016.
- "Lineage and Honors: Headquarters and Headquarters Battery, 56th Field Artillery Command" (PDF). US Army.
- "Organizational Actions of Units to Form the 9th Field Artillery Regiment Under the US Army Regimental System (USARS)" (PDF). US Army. 15 January 1986. DAGO 1985-34.
- "20–12. Badges authorized for wear on Army uniforms". Wear and Appearance of Army Uniforms and Insignia (PDF). United States Army. 25 May 2017. p. 43. Army Regulation 670–1.

=== History ===
- History of the Field Artillery School; Volume I 1911–1942 (PDF). Fort Sill, Oklahoma: United States Army. 1942. Archived (PDF) from the original on 10 June 2016.
- History of the Field Artillery School; Volume II World War II (PDF). Fort Sill, Oklahoma: United States Army. 1946. Archived (PDF) from the original on 10 June 2016.
- History of the U.S. Army Field Artillery and Missile School; Volume III 1945–1957 (PDF). Fort Sill, Oklahoma: United States Army. 1957. Archived (PDF) from the original on 10 June 2016.
- History of the U.S. Army Field Artillery and Missile School; Volume IV 1958–1967 (PDF). Fort Sill, Oklahoma: United States Army. 1967. Archived (PDF) from the original on 10 June 2016.
- McKenney, Janice E. (2010). Field Artillery. Army Lineage Series (Second ed.). Washington D.C.: US Army Center of Military History. CMH Pub 60-11. Archived from the original (PDF) on 15 April 2019.
- McKenney, Janice E. (2007). "Pershing II Versus Cruise Missiles". Organizational History of Field Artillery 1775 - 2003. Washington D.C.: US Army Center of Military History. pp. 238–240. Archived from the original (PDF) on 7 November 2014.
- McKenney, Janice E. (2007). "Pershing Missile". Organizational History of Field Artillery 1775 - 2003. Washington D.C.: US Army Center of Military History. pp. 230–234. Archived from the original (PDF) on 7 November 2014.
- Raines, Rebecca Robbins (2005). Signal Corps (PDF). Army Lineage Series. Washington D.C.: US Army Center of Military History. CMH Pub 60-15. Archived from the original (PDF) on 29 August 2017.
- Hughes, Kaylene (Fall 2009). "The Army's Precision "Sunday Punch": The Pershing II and the Intermediate Range Nuclear Forces Treaty" (PDF). Army History. US Army Center of Military History: 6–16. Archived from the original (PDF) on 8 June 2010.
- Orders for 251st Ordnance Detachment. Redstone Arsenal, Alabama: Ordnance Guided Missile School. 24 November 1964.

=== Technical manuals ===
- Direct Support and General Support Maintenance Repair Parts and Special Tools List Including Depot Maintenance Repair Parts and Special Tools for Azimuth Laying Set, Guided Missile AN/TSQ-110 (Pershing 1a Field Artillery Missile System). United States Army. July 1984. TM 9-1430-379-34P.
- DS and GS Maintenance Manual: Wiring Data for Programmer-Test Station AN/TSM-87 and Electronic Circuit Plug-in Unit Test Set AN/TSM-117 (Pershing 1a Field Artillery Missile System) (PDF). United States Army. April 1969. TM 9-1427-380-34/2.
- "M656". Equipment Data Sheets for TACOM Combat & Tactical Equipment. United States Army. June 1985. pp. 4-202 – 4-203. TM 43-0001-31.
- "M757". Equipment Data Sheets for TACOM Combat & Tactical Equipment. United States Army. June 1985. pp. 4-286 – 4-287. TM 43-0001-31.
- "M791". Equipment Data Sheets for TACOM Combat & Tactical Equipment. United States Army. June 1985. pp. 4-312 – 4-313. TM 43-0001-31.
- Operator's Manual Duties of Horizontal Laying Theodolite, Vertical Laying Theodolite and Orienting Station Theodolite Operators (Pershing 1a Field Artillery Missile System) (PDF). United States Army. April 1972. TM-9-1425-381-10-8.
- Operator, Organizational, DS, and GS Maintenance Manual: Administrative Storage, Surveillance, Shipment on Tactical Vehicles, and Demolition to Prevent Enemy Use (PDF). United States Army. August 1979. TM 9-1425-384-14.
- Operator, Organizational, DS, and GS Maintenance Manual: Battery Control Central AN/MSW-8 (Pershing 1a Field Artillery Missile System) (PDF). United States Army. April 1969. TM 9-1427-381-14.
- Operator, Organizational, DS, and GS Maintenance Manual: Handling Equipment and Mounting Kits (Pershing 1a Field Artillery Missile System) (PDF). United States Army. April 1969. TM 9-1450-380-14.
- Operator, Organizational, DS and GS Maintenance Manual: Operation and Maintenance of System Components Test Station AN/MSM-94 (PDF). United States Army. April 1969. TM 9-4935-385-14-1.
- Operator and Organizational Maintenance Manual: Troubleshooting of Programmer-Test Station AN/TSM-87 and Electronic Circuit Plug-in Unit Test Set AN/TSM-117 (Pershing 1a Field Artillery Missile System) (PDF). United States Army. April 1969. TM 9-1427-380-12/2.
- Operators Manual, Power Station, Guided Missile System, AN/TJQ-9 (PDF). United States Army. December 1979. TM 9-1450-382-10.
- Organizational, DS, and GS Maintenance Manual Shipping and Storage Containers (PDF). United States Army. November 1972. TM 9-8140-380-24.
- Operator, Organizational, DS and GS Maintenance Manual: Electrical Repair Shop, Guided Missile System Semitrailer Mounted (4935-01-094-6722) and Mechanical Repair Shop, Guided Missile System Semitrailer Mounted (4935-01-094-6723), (Pershing 1a Field Artillery Missile System) (PDF). United States Army. July 1981. TM 9-4935-390-14.
- Organizational Maintenance Repair Parts and Special Tools List for Computer, Missile Programmer-test Station 11052000-29, 11051951-19, 1430-00-078-8098, 1430-01-007-3855 (PDF). United States Army. April 1983. TM 9-1430-385-20P.
- Pershing II Weapon System (System Description) (PDF). United States Army. June 1986. TM 9-1425-386-10-1.
- Principles of Artillery Weapons (PDF). United States Army. May 1981. TM 9-3305.
- Semitrailer Mounted Guided Missile Erector-Launcher M790 Transporter Operation, Test, Adjustment and Maintenance Procedures (Pershing 1a Field Artillery Missile System) (PDF). United States Army. August 1979. TB 9-1440-380-14-4.
- Pershing 1a Field Service Data Notebook (PDF). United States Army. 30 September 1972.
- Organizational, Direct Support and General Support Maintenance Manual: Pershing 1a Tactical Countdown Program Flow Diagrams and Readback Information and Missile Section In-container/In-van Cabling and Readback Data (Pershing 1a Field Artillery Missile System) (PDF). United States Army. December 1975. TM 9-1425-380-24-2.
- Pershing 1a Ground Support Equipment Circuit Cards: Circuit Network Cards & Module Schematic Diagrams (PDF). Redstone Arsenal, Alabama: US Army Missile and Munitions Center and School. July 1972. BP-4437.
- Operator and Organizational Maintenance Manual Generator Set, Diesel Engine Driven, Tactical Skid Mtd. 30 KW, 3 Phase, 4 Wire, 120/208 and 240/416 Volts (PDF). United States Army. January 1975. TM 5-6115-465-12.
- Organizational Maintenance Repair Parts and Special Tools List Forward and Rear Area Ground Networks, Interconnecting Kit and Distribution Box (Pershing 1A Field Artillery Guided Missile System) (PDF). United States Army. January 1983. TM 9-1430-381-20P.
- Organizational Maintenance Repair Parts and Special Tools List for Test Set, Electrical Circuit, Guided Missile Launcher, ANTSM97, 4935-00-878-4654, Test Set, Electronic Circuit Plug-in Unit, ANTSM117, 6625-01-004-8513, Simulator Warhead Components, XM6E1, 4935-00-908-8153, Test Set, Electrical Cable Interconnecting Box (Artillery Set), 8599670-5 (Pershing 1A Field Artillery Missile System) (PDF). United States Army. June 1983. TM 9-4935-385-20P.
- Calibration Procedures for Tool Kit, Guided Missile 4935-791-0079, Torque Kit, Wrench (Spark-proof) 4935-791-0051, and Screwdriver Bit, Socket Set, Torque Handle 5120-021-2040 (PDF). Army TB.TB 750-111. United States Army. 26 April 1969. TB 750-11.
- Organizational Maintenance Repair Parts and Special Tools List: Launching Control Group, Guided Missile, Trailer Mounted OJ-365(XO-1) (V)/G 11060081-19 1440-01-055-7557 (Pershing 1a Field Artillery Missile System) (PDF). Technical manual; TM 9-1430-382-20P. United States Army. December 1982. TM 9-1430-382-20P.
- Organizational Maintenance Repair Parts and Special Tools List for Erector-launcher, Guided Missile, Semitrailer Mounted M790, 11038000-79, 1440-00-383-5261, 11038000-89, 1440-01-049-5321 (Pershing 1a Field Artillery Missile System) (PDF). Tm; 9-1440-380-20P. United States Army. April 1983. TM 9-1440-380-20P.
- Direct Support Maintenance Manual for Truck Tractor: 10-ton, 8x8, M1001, M1002, M1013, M1014 (PDF). United States Army. 3 June 1983. TM 9-2320-282-30.
- Operator's Manual Manual for Truck Tractor: 10-ton, 8x8, M1001, M1002, M1013, M1014 (PDF). United States Army. 12 September 1983. TM 9-2320-282-30.

=== Soldier's manuals ===
- Soldier's Manual Trainer's Guide: Pershing Electronics Repairer Sill Levels 3/4 MOS 21L (PDF). United States Army. 29 June 1984. STP 9-21L34-SM-TG.
- Soldier's Manual: Pershing Missile Crewmember PII MOS 15E Skill Level 1 (PDF). United States Army. February 1986. STP 6-15E1-SM.
- Soldier's Manual and Trainer Guide: Pershing Missile Crewmember PII MOS 15E Skill Levels 2/3/4 (PDF). United States Army. February 1986. STP 6-15E24-SM-TG.
- Commander's Manual: Pershing Electronics Material Specialist/Supervisor MOS 21G. United States Army. 3 February 1978. FM 6-21G/CM.

=== Other ===
- Shi-Xue Tsai. Introduction to the Scene Matching Missile Guidance Technologies (PDF). SCITRAN (trans.). National Air Intelligence Center. Archived from the original on 2 February 2015. Translated from: Promotion of Chinese Aviation Between Centuries: Proceedings of Conference for 30th Anniversary of CSAA Establishment (in Chinese). 1996. pp. 227–237.
- Bagley, Hubert D.; Billions, Novella S. (12 June 1963). Atmospheric Environment for Pershing Missile 405 (PDF). US Army Missile Command. Archived from the original (PDF) on 2 February 2017.
- Grier, John H. (July 1966). Pershing Transportability Study, Foreign Railways, Volume III of IV (PDF). Fort Eustis, Virginia: US Army Transportation Engineering Agency. Archived from the original (PDF) on 21 December 2016.
- Grier, John H. (July 1966). Pershing Transportability Study, Foreign Railways, Volume II of IV (PDF). Fort Eustis, Virginia: US Army Transportation Engineering Agency.
- Grier, John H. (July 1966). Pershing Transportability Study, Vessel Stowage, Volume IV of IV (PDF). Fort Eustis, Virginia: US Army Transportation Engineering Agency. Archived from the original (PDF) on 29 July 2018.
- Knaur, James A. (August 1986). Technical Investigation of 11 January 1985: Pershing II Motor Fire. Defense Technical Information Center. Archived from the original (PDF) on 8 April 2013.
- Leventhal, Herbert A. (1992). Project Management in the Army Material Command 1962-1987 (PDF). AMC Historical Office.
- Seltzer, Sherman M. (November 1971). Digital Redesign of Pershing Attitude Control System.
- A Community Celebration in Recognition of Final INF Pershing II Elimination (PDF). United States Army. May 1991.
- A Second Study on Reduction or Elimination of Air Conditioning in the Pershing Guidance and Control Compartment (PDF). US Army Missile Command. 24 January 1963. Archived from the original (PDF) on 2 February 2017.
- "Appendix B, Nonrecurring Cost Recoupment Charges". DoD Financial Management Regulation Volume 15 (PDF). Archived from the original (PDF) on 19 September 2014.
- Final Missile Elimination Longhorn Army Ammunition Plant (PDF). United States Army. 6 May 1991.
- JFK's Visit to White Sands. United States Army. 5 June 1963. Archived from the original on 2 February 2008.
- Pershing - Mission Complete - Retired With Honor (PDF). United States Army. May 1991.
- Pershing Escort Officer's Equipment Information Guide (PDF). United States Army. June 1988.
- Pershing II Firing Battery (PDF). United States Army. March 1985. FM 6-11.
- Pershing II Maintenance, Repair Parts and Special Tools List Manuals (PDF). United States Army.
- Pershing II Reduced Range (PDF). United States Army.
- Pershing in Europe (PDF). United States Army, 56th Field Artillery Brigade.
- Pershing PII Inertial Measurement Unit Field Gyrocompass Test. US Army Missile Research and Development Command. June 1977. TG-77-16. Archived from the original on 13 April 2017.
- Pershing PM Countdown (PDF). Redstone Arsenal, Alabama: Pershing Project Manager's Office. c. 1978.
- Pitch Damping Tests of the Pershing Re-entry Body (PDF). Naval Ordnance Laboratory. 10 June 1960. Archived from the original (PDF) on 30 October 2018.
- "The Pershing Missile— Mighty and Mobile" (PDF). Project MAN: Modern Army Needs. United States Army. May 1960. p. 11.
- Selected Aspects of the Army's Program to Reuse Pershing Missile System Equipment (PDF). Government Accountability Office. December 1990. GAO/NSIAD-91-96.
- The Pershing Guided Missile System (PDF). Fort Sill, Oklahoma: US Army Artillery and Missile School. February 1965.
- U.S. Army - Pershing Elimination (PDF). United States Army. 6 May 1991.
- U.S. Army Ordnance Missile Command. United States Army.
- Use of a New Propellant Composition in the Pershing Missile (PDF). Redstone Arsenal, Alabama: Rohm & Haas. 29 December 1959. Archived from the original (PDF) on 29 July 2018.
- Thongchua, Nat; Kaczmarek, Michael (7 November 1994). "Theater Missile Defense Targets for Interceptor Test and Evaluation" (PDF). 1994 AIAA Missile Sciences Conference. Archived (PDF) from the original on 13 December 2014.
- Bachman, Jim (16 July 1982). "A Battalion is Born". Donau. Neu-Ulm, West Germany: US Army.
- Powers, Patrick W. (May 1963). "Blackjack: The Giant Killer". Army.
- "55th Maintenance Battalion". Donau. Neu-Ulm, West Germany: US Army. 16 July 1982.
- "Goodbye Pershing II" (PDF). Soldiers. United States Army: 45–48. August 1991.
- "The Pershing Weapon System and Its Elimination". United States Army. Archived from the original on 12 July 2015.

== US Air Force ==
- Lemmer, George F. (January 1966). Strengthening USAF General Purpose Forces, 1961-1964 (PDF). USAF Historical Division Liaison Office.

== German Air Force ==
- Berghoff, Major Walter (1970). "In einem Flugkörpergeschwader Pershing" [Pershing Missile Squadron] (PDF). Jahrbuch der Luftwaffe [Yearbook of the German Air Force] (in German). German Air Force.

== Central Intelligence Agency ==
- "Three-Dimensional Model Announcement" (PDF). Central Intelligence Agency. Archived from the original (PDF) on 23 January 2017.
- "Alleged Us Arms Sales to Chile: Possible Soviet Disinformation" (PDF). Department of State. 21 February 1984. Archived from the original (PDF) on 23 January 2017.
- "Soviet Leadership Views of the Pershing Threat" (PDF). Central Intelligence Agency. 15 February 1983. Archived from the original (PDF) on 23 January 2017.
- "Zagladin: USSR Would Deploy Missiles as Response to Pershing" (PDF). Central Intelligence Agency. 9 March 1983. Archived from the original (PDF) on 23 January 2017.

== MAN ==
- "Pershing II 8x8 Tactical Truck for Pershing II Project Office Demonstration Program". M.A.N. Corporation. June 1980.

== Articles ==
=== Aviation Week ===
- "Blowout Plugs Fitted to Pershing SCRAM Missile for Range Control" (PDF). Aviation Week: 24. 1 February 1960.
- "Pershing Service Tower at Cape Canaveral" (PDF). Aviation Week: 32. 15 February 1960.
- "Army-Martin Pershing Unveiled" (PDF). Aviation Week: 39. 22 February 1960.
- "First Army Pershing Test Vehicle Fired" (PDF). Aviation Week: 87. 14 March 1960.
- "Army Pershing Tactical Missile Flies 30 mi. on First Firing" (PDF). Aviation Week: 110. 4 April 1960.
- "Tight Control Keeps Pershing Program on Schedule" (PDF). Aviation Week: 80–87. 9 April 1962.

=== Bulletin of the Atomic Scientists ===
- Arkin, William M. (June 1983). "Pershing II and U.S. Nuclear Strategy". Bulletin of the Atomic Scientists. 39 (6): 12–13. Bibcode:1983BuAtS..39f..12A. doi:10.1080/00963402.1983.11459002.
- Paine, Christopher (October 1980). "Pershing II: The Army's Strategic Weapon". Bulletin of the Atomic Scientists. 36 (8): 25–31. Bibcode:1980BuAtS..36h..25P. doi:10.1080/00963402.1980.11458766.

=== Field Artillery ===
==== Artillery Trends (1958–1969) ====
- "The Pershing Missile— The Army's Blackjack" (PDF). Artillery Trends: 30–34. May 1960.
- Callaghan, Henry E. (February 1962). "Track–80" (PDF). Artillery Trends: 4–6.
- Tupper, Fred A.; Hausburg, E. E. (January 1963). "Field Artillery's Newest Missile" (PDF). Artillery Trends: 36–40.
- "Pershing—Chinook Tests" (PDF). Artillery Trends: 68. April 1963.
- Hatter, William T. (February 1964). "Pershing: New Artillery Sunday Punch" (PDF). Artillery Trends: 41–47.
- "Pershing MOS" (PDF). Artillery Trends: 4. July 1965.

==== The Field Artilleryman (1969-1973) ====
- Moore, Alan L. Jr. (April 1969). "A New Look of Pershing" (PDF). The Field Artilleryman: 49–57.
- "Improvement of Pershing One Creates Pershing One Alfa" (PDF). The Field Artilleryman: 12. November 1969.
- "Instructional Department Notes: Pershing" (PDF). The Field Artilleryman: 76–78. August 1971. Archived from the original (PDF) on 29 November 2014.
- Bonner, John E. (February 1972). "Pershing 1a" (PDF). The Field Artilleryman: 41–47.

==== Field Artillery Journal (1973-1987) ====
- "56th Field Artillery Brigade: Pershing in Europe" (PDF). Field Artillery Journal: 24–25. May 1974.
- "New Pershing Systems Tested" (PDF). Field Artillery Journal: 20–25. November 1974.
- "Pershing System Modular Improvement" (PDF). Field Artillery Journal: 30. May 1976.
- Moore, Alan L. (July–August 1977). "Missile Info Void" (PDF). Field Artillery Journal: 4.
- Baker, Robert J. (May–June 1977). "Pershing— The Ultimate Challenge" (PDF). Field Artillery Journal: 9–14. Archived from the original (PDF) on 11 February 2017.
- Lyman, Donald R. (May–June 1977). "POTU: Testing Pershing in Europe and CONUS" (PDF). Field Artillery Journal: 15–17.
- Hunt, Larry H. (May–June 1977). "Pershing II" (PDF). Field Artillery Journal: 38–39.
- Moore, Alan L. (May–June 1977). "Pershing— A Weapon for Long-range Fire Support" (PDF). Field Artillery Journal: 26–28. Archived from the original (PDF) on 11 February 2017.
- Riordan, Kenn (March 1978). "Decontaminate and Survive!" (PDF). Field Artillery Journal: 58–59.
- "The Journal interviews: 1LT Elizabeth A. Tourville" (PDF). Field Artillery Journal: 28–29. November 1978.
- Busse, Charlane (July 1978). "First Women Join Pershing Training" (PDF). Field Artillery Journal: 40.
- "Pershing II launch Slated for April 1982" (PDF). Field Artillery Journal: 26. March 1980.
- Shearer, Robert L. (May 1980). "Development of Pershing II" (PDF). Field Artillery Journal: 30–36.
- "400th Pershing Missile Launched" (PDF). Field Artillery Journal: 51. January 1981.
- "PII Guidance System to be Tested" (PDF). Field Artillery Journal: 40–41. May–June 1978.
- Forest, Ronald P. (May–June 1982). "The Challenge of Pershing" (PDF). Field Artillery Journal: 5.
- Curtis, Myron F. (September 1982). "TACEVAL: Pershing's ARTEP" (PDF). Field Artillery Journal: 50–51.
- Ellis, B. H.; Bell, R. F. (September 1982). "Operational Testing of New Field Artillery Systems" (PDF). Field Artillery Journal: 8–12.
- Curtis, Myron F. (January–February 1983). "Pershing Brigade Reorganization" (PDF). Field Artillery Journal: 2.
- "Target Reference for Pershing II" (PDF). Field Artillery Journal: 36. January 1984.
- "Pershing II" (PDF). Field Artillery Journal: 34. January 1984.
- Sankner, Robert; Norris, Peter H. (July 1984). "One Up on 1a" (PDF). Field Artillery Journal: 16–19.
- "Surviving with Pershing II" (PDF). Field Artillery Journal: 32. January 1985.
- Green, Gary A. (July 1985). "The Accident in Heilbronn" (PDF). Field Artillery Journal: 33. Archived from the original (PDF) on 4 March 2016.
- Middleton, Doug (September 1985). "How Good it Is!" (PDF). Field Artillery Journal: 51.
- "Pershing Study Group" (PDF). Field Artillery Journal: 52. May–June 1986.
- Wilde, Richard W. (July 1987). "Kuila-I Ka-Nuu" (PDF). Field Artillery Journal: 28–31.

==== Field Artillery (1987-2007) ====
- Breitenbach, Daniel L. (October 1988). "The End of the Pershing Era: The INF Treaty" (PDF). Field Artillery: 13–16. Archived (PDF) from the original on 14 February 2019.
- Curtis, Myron F.; Brown, Thomas M.; Hogan, John C. (February 1991). "Pershing— It Gave Peace a Chance" (PDF). Field Artillery: 28–32.
- Kirk, Michael L. (August 1992). "Nuke..."End of Mission, Out"" (PDF). Field Artillery: 40–41.

==== Fires (2007) ====
- Melton, Stephen L. (17 June 2014). "Resurrecting the Coast Artillery" (PDF). Fires. US Army: 61–63.

=== Interavia ===
- "Pershing Rockets for Europe" (PDF). Interavia. July 1961.
- "Training Pershing Crews" (PDF). Interavia. December 1962.

=== Life ===
- Villet, Grey (July 1983). "Dead Aim" (PDF). Life.
- Loengard, John (1 October 1961). "Photo 53381082: Texas, United States - October 1961: President John F. Kennedy with General Paul Adams, during tour of a Pershing missile at Fort Bragg". AllPosters.

=== The New York Times ===
- "Unarmed Pershing Missile Strays into Mexico; It Goes Off Course After U.S. Troops Launch It in Utah". The New York Times. 13 September 1967.
- Mohr, Charles (27 February 1983). "Pershings put Moscow on 6-minute Warning". The New York Times.
- Tagliabue, John (5 April 1983). "West Germans Protest Nuclear Missiles for 4th Day". The New York Times.
- "Protesters Smash Missile Vehicle at U.S. Base in West Germany". The New York Times. AP. 5 December 1983.
- Keller, Bill (1 May 1985). "Army Terms Pershing 2 Missiles Vulnerable to Terror in Germany". The New York Times.

=== The Ordnance Magazine ===
- Jones III, Lauris T. (Winter 1986). "The Pershing Rocket Motor" (PDF). The Ordnance Magazine. United States Army Ordnance Corps Association. pp. 42–45.
- "Privates Take Charge" (PDF). The Ordnance Magazine. United States Army Ordnance Corps Association. Winter 1986. p. 58.

=== The Giant and The Pershing Cable ===
- The Giant. 56th Artillery Group. 15 November 1967.
- The Giant. 56th Artillery Group. 22 December 1967.
- The Giant. 56th Artillery Group. 23 February 1968.
- The Giant. 56th Artillery Group. March 1968.
- The Giant. 56th Artillery Group. May 1968.
- The Giant. 56th Artillery Group. July 1968.
- The Giant. 56th Artillery Group. August 1968.
- The Giant. 56th Artillery Group. 2 May 1969.
- The Giant. 56th Artillery Group. 13 June 1969.
- The Giant. 56th Artillery Group. 30 June 1969.
- The Giant. 56th Artillery Group. 18 July 1969.
- The Giant. 56th Artillery Group. 1 August 1969.
- The Giant. 56th Artillery Group. April 1971.
- The Giant. 56th Artillery Group. May 1971.
- The Giant. 56th Artillery Group. June 1971.
- The Giant. 56th Artillery Group. July 1971.
- The Giant. 56th Field Artillery Brigade. September 1972.
- The Giant. 56th Field Artillery Brigade. October 1972.
- The Giant. 56th Field Artillery Brigade. January 1973.
- The Giant. 56th Field Artillery Brigade. February 1973.
- The Giant. 56th Field Artillery Brigade. October 1973.
- The Giant. 56th Field Artillery Brigade. June 1974.
- The Giant. 56th Field Artillery Brigade. November 1974.
- The Giant. 56th Field Artillery Brigade. September 1974.
- The Giant. 56th Field Artillery Brigade. April 1975.
- The Giant. 56th Field Artillery Brigade. September 1975.
- The Giant. 56th Field Artillery Brigade. November 1975.
- The Giant. 56th Field Artillery Brigade. August 1976.
- The Pershing Cable. 56th Field Artillery Brigade. October 1977.
- The Pershing Cable. 56th Field Artillery Brigade. November 1977.
- The Pershing Cable. 56th Field Artillery Brigade. February 1978.
- The Pershing Cable. 56th Field Artillery Brigade. May 1978.
- The Pershing Cable. 56th Field Artillery Brigade. August 1978.
- The Pershing Cable. 56th Field Artillery Brigade. April 1979.
- The Pershing Cable. 56th Field Artillery Brigade. October 1979.
- The Pershing Cable. 56th Field Artillery Brigade. November 1979.
- The Pershing Cable. 56th Field Artillery Brigade. April 1980.
- The Pershing Cable. 56th Field Artillery Brigade. May 1980.
- The Pershing Cable. 56th Field Artillery Brigade. February 1981.
- The Pershing Cable. 56th Field Artillery Brigade. September 1981.
- The Pershing Cable. 56th Field Artillery Brigade. December 1981.
- The Pershing Cable. 56th Field Artillery Brigade. April 1982.
- The Pershing Cable. 56th Field Artillery Brigade. July 1982.
- The Pershing Cable. 56th Field Artillery Brigade. August 1982.
- The Pershing Cable. 56th Field Artillery Brigade. December 1982.
- The Pershing Cable. 56th Field Artillery Brigade. May 1983.
- The Pershing Cable. 56th Field Artillery Brigade. June 1983.
- The Pershing Cable. 56th Field Artillery Brigade. August 1983.
- The Pershing Cable. 56th Field Artillery Brigade. September 1983.
- The Pershing Cable. 56th Field Artillery Brigade. May 1984.
- The Pershing Cable. 56th Field Artillery Brigade. June 1984.
- The Pershing Cable. 56th Field Artillery Brigade. August 1984.
- The Pershing Cable. 56th Field Artillery Brigade. February 1985.
- The Pershing Cable. 56th Field Artillery Brigade. May 1985.
- The Pershing Cable. 56th Field Artillery Brigade. October 1985.
- The Pershing Cable. 56th Field Artillery Command. Spring 1986.
- "Orientation Issue: Welcome to the 56th F.A. Command (Pershing)". The Pershing Cable. Vol. 25, no. 1. 56th Field Artillery Command. 1986–1987.
- The Pershing Cable. 56th Field Artillery Command. June 1987.
- The Pershing Cable. 56th Field Artillery Command. July 1987.
- The Pershing Cable. 56th Field Artillery Command. September 1987.
- The Pershing Cable. 56th Field Artillery Command. October 1987.
- The Pershing Cable. 56th Field Artillery Command. November 1987.
- The Pershing Cable. 56th Field Artillery Command. February 1988.
- The Pershing Cable. 56th Field Artillery Command. September 1988.
- The Pershing Cable. 56th Field Artillery Command. October 1988.
- The Pershing Cable. 56th Field Artillery Command. November 1988.
- The Pershing Cable. 56th Field Artillery Command. December 1988.
- The Pershing Cable. 56th Field Artillery Command. January 1989.
- The Pershing Cable. 56th Field Artillery Command. February 1989.
- The Pershing Cable. 56th Field Artillery Command. March 1989.
- The Pershing Cable. 56th Field Artillery Command. April 1989.
- The Pershing Cable. 56th Field Artillery Command. May 1989.
- The Pershing Cable. 56th Field Artillery Command. June 1989.
- The Pershing Cable. 56th Field Artillery Command. July 1989.
- The Pershing Cable. 56th Field Artillery Command. August 1989.
- The Pershing Cable. 56th Field Artillery Command. September 1989.
- The Pershing Cable. 56th Field Artillery Command. December 1989.
- The Pershing Cable. 56th Field Artillery Command. January 1990.
- The Pershing Cable. 56th Field Artillery Command. February 1990.
- The Pershing Cable. 56th Field Artillery Command. March 1990.
- The Pershing Cable. 56th Field Artillery Command. April 1990.
- The Pershing Cable. 56th Field Artillery Command. May 1990.
- The Pershing Cable. 56th Field Artillery Command. June 1990.
- The Pershing Cable. 56th Field Artillery Command. July 1990.
- The Pershing Cable. 56th Field Artillery Command. August 1990.
- The Pershing Cable. 56th Field Artillery Command. September 1990.
- The Pershing Cable. 56th Field Artillery Command. October 1990.
- The Pershing Cable. 56th Field Artillery Command. November 1990.
- The Pershing Cable. 56th Field Artillery Command. December 1990.
- The Pershing Cable. 56th Field Artillery Command. January 1991.
- The Pershing Cable. 56th Field Artillery Command. February 1991.
- The Pershing Cable. 56th Field Artillery Command. March 1991.
- The Pershing Cable. 56th Field Artillery Command. April 1991.
- The Pershing Cable. 56th Field Artillery Command. May 1991.

=== PS: The Preventive Maintenance Monthly ===
- "The Pershing Missile" (PDF). PS: The Preventive Maintenance Monthly. No. 163. United States Army. 1966. pp. 45–51.
- "Backward Power for a Track-80" (PDF). PS: The Preventive Maintenance Monthly. No. 163. United States Army. 1966. pp. 52–53.
- "Pershing 1A Erector Launcher: Hold Your Hose". PS: The Preventive Maintenance Monthly. No. 286. United States Army. September 1976. p. 26. Archived from the original (PDF) on 27 March 2017.
- "Pershing Pooper". PS: The Preventive Maintenance Monthly. No. 286. United States Army. September 1976. p. 27. Archived from the original (PDF) on 27 March 2017.
- "Hold the Pershing Paint" (PDF). PS: The Preventive Maintenance Monthly. No. 293. United States Army. April 1977. p. 6. TB 43-PS-425.
- "Pershing II Missile: Little Things Mean a Lot" (PDF). PS: The Preventive Maintenance Monthly (425). United States Army. April 1988. TB 43-PS-425.
- "Latch Up Danger" (PDF). PS: The Preventive Maintenance Monthly. No. 412. United States Army. March 1987. p. 15. TB 43-PS-412.

=== Redstone Rocket ===
- "'Solid' Redstone Named Pershing" (PDF). Redstone Rocket. Redstone Arsenal, Alabama. 22 January 1958. p. 1. Archived from the original (PDF) on 6 March 2016.
- "Pershing, Hawk Contracts Given" (PDF). Redstone Rocket. Redstone Arsenal, Alabama. 10 October 1962. p. 12. Archived from the original (PDF) on 6 March 2016.
- "Pershing Management Introduces Innovations" (PDF). Redstone Rocket. Redstone Arsenal, Alabama. 16 January 1964. p. 4. Archived from the original (PDF) on 6 March 2016.
- "Pershing 1A Equipment Heads Towards Germany" (PDF). Redstone Rocket. Redstone Arsenal, Alabama. 6 August 1969. p. 1. Archived from the original (PDF) on 6 March 2016.
- "Pershing Behaves as Planned" (PDF). Redstone Rocket. Redstone Arsenal, Alabama. 3 August 1960. p. 1. Archived from the original (PDF) on 25 February 2016.
- "$30 Million Added to Martin Contract on Pershing" (PDF). Redstone Rocket. Redstone Arsenal, Alabama. 3 August 1960. p. 1. Archived from the original (PDF) on 25 February 2016.
- "Zeus, Pershing Score!" (PDF). Redstone Rocket. Redstone Arsenal, Alabama. 22 November 1962. p. 1. Archived from the original (PDF) on 7 March 2016.
- "Carl Pinyerd is Named Mr. Pershing in ABMA" (PDF). Redstone Rocket. Redstone Arsenal, Alabama. 20 July 1960. p. 1. Archived from the original (PDF) on 7 March 2016.
- "Pershing Among Missiles Eliminated in Treaty" (PDF). Redstone Rocket. Redstone Arsenal, Alabama. 16 December 1987. p. 1. Archived from the original (PDF) on 7 March 2016.
- "250 Key Personnel Will Take Pershing Training" (PDF). Redstone Rocket. Redstone Arsenal, Alabama. 27 September 1967. p. 1. Archived from the original (PDF) on 7 March 2016.
- "Pershing, Chinook Test Battlefield Mobility" (PDF). Redstone Rocket. Redstone Arsenal, Alabama. 17 March 1965. p. 1. Archived from the original (PDF) on 7 March 2016.
- "Pershing Has Birthday" (PDF). Redstone Rocket. Redstone Arsenal, Alabama. 24 February 1965. p. 1. Archived from the original (PDF) on 7 March 2016.
- "Pershing 1A is Rolling Toward Ft. Sill in SWAP" (PDF). Redstone Rocket. Redstone Arsenal, Alabama. 2 April 1969. p. 1. Archived from the original (PDF) on 7 March 2016.
- "Army Women Study Missiles, Munitions" (PDF). Redstone Rocket. Redstone Arsenal, Alabama. 20 March 1974. p. 5. Archived from the original (PDF) on 14 March 2016.
- "Pershing II Fired on Long-range Test Flight" (PDF). Redstone Rocket. Redstone Arsenal, Alabama. 26 January 1983. p. 1. Archived from the original (PDF) on 15 March 2016.
- "Pershing Managers Meet Here" (PDF). Redstone Rocket. Redstone Arsenal, Alabama. 14 November 1962. p. 1. Archived from the original (PDF) on 15 March 2016.
- "Pershing Rolls On" (PDF). Redstone Rocket. Redstone Arsenal, Alabama. 12 October 1966. p. 1. Archived from the original (PDF) on 15 March 2016.
- "Troops Shoot Pershing Without Hitch" (PDF). Redstone Rocket. Redstone Arsenal, Alabama. 24 April 1963. p. 1. Archived from the original (PDF) on 15 March 2016.
- "Troops are Successful in Firing" (PDF). Redstone Rocket. Redstone Arsenal, Alabama. 16 October 1963. p. 1. Archived from the original (PDF) on 15 March 2016.
- "Army Test Fires Pershing at Cape Canaveral for First Time" (PDF). Redstone Rocket. Redstone Arsenal, Alabama. 2 March 1960. p. 1. Archived from the original (PDF) on 15 March 2016.
- "New Look for Pershing; Wheels Replace Tracks" (PDF). Redstone Rocket. Redstone Arsenal, Alabama. 14 June 1967. p. 8. Archived from the original (PDF) on 15 March 2016.
- "Pershing II Finds Permanent Home" (PDF). Redstone Rocket. Redstone Arsenal, Alabama. 25 July 1990. p. 1. Archived from the original (PDF) on 8 February 2017.

=== Time ===
- "Charlie's Hurricane". Armed Forces. Time. 6 June 1956. Archived from the original on 2 February 2008.
- "Defense: Don't Look Up— There's a Missile There". Time. 4 October 1963.
- "Missiles for Peace". Time. 29 September 1975. Archived from the original on 2 February 2008.
- "The World: Israel Will Not Be the Party". Time. 6 October 1975.
- "Missile Misfire". Time. 2 August 1982.
- "Look! Up in the Sky! At Last!". Time. 29 November 1982.
- Talbott, Strobe (31 January 1983). "Playing Nuclear Poker". Time.
  - "Playing Nuclear Poker". Time (Cover). 31 January 1983.
- "Armaments: Tempting Target for Terrorists". Time. 13 May 1985.
- Markham, James M. (12 January 1985). "3 G.I.'s Die at German Base When Missile Catches Fire". The New York Times.
- "Charity: Writing Off The Weapons". Time. 28 August 1991. Archived from the original on 11 January 2005.

=== Other ===
- Davenas, Alain; Rat, Roger (July–August 2002). "Sensitivity of Solid Rocket Motors to Electrostatic Discharge: History and Futures" (PDF). Journal of Propulsion and Power. 18 (4): 805–809. doi:10.2514/2.6003.
- Eskow, Dennis, ed. (January 1984). "Raining Fire" (PDF). Popular Mechanics. Hearst.
- Harsch, Joseph. (22 June 1983). "U.S. Has Other Defense Options" (PDF). Beaver County Times.
- Martin, Robert D. "We Gave Peace a Chance" (PDF). The Cold War Times (November–December 2003). Cold War Museum: 14–17. Archived from the original (PDF) on 20 December 2015.
- Martin, Robert D. "The Pershing Missile System and the Cold War". The Cold War Times. Cold War Museum. Archived from the original on 19 March 2016.
- Mentzer, William R. Jr. (1998). "Test and Evaluation of Land-Mobile Missile Systems" (PDF). Johns Hopkins APL Technical Digest. Johns Hopkins University.
- Pescovitz, Mark (January 1970). "Pershing 1: US Army Tactical Missile" (PDF). Model Rocketry.
- Rudd, Edwin A. "The Pershing is 1-A" (PDF). Ordnance (September – October 1968): 179–182.
- Thomsen, Cindy (Spring 2012). "On the Front Lines of the Cold War". Vanderbilt Engineering. Vanderbilt University.
- Tillman, John (1985). "Beyond Rhetoric to the Facts: The Trans-Atlantic Cruise Challenge to the Alliance" (PDF). Armed Conflict: 50–55, 82.
- "Modelers at Work in Aviation, Space and Electronics". American Modeler. Condé Nast. August 1962.
- "Eine Waffe fur alle Falle" [A Weapon for all Situations] (PDF). Stern (in German). 21 December 1983. pp. 114–115.
- "Pershing on the Move" (PDF). Army Digest: 25–27. September 1967.
- "Pershing General Managers Meet at Kearfott" (PDF). Kearfacts: 4. July–August 1975.
- "German Pershings the Stumbling Block" (PDF). Jane's Defence Weekly: 249. 15 August 1987.
- "Pershing Missileman Proud of Peaceful Era" (PDF). The Cannoneer: 4A. 8 November 1990.
- "Pershing Short Range Battlefield Support Missile System" (PDF). War Machine. 1 (2): 21.
- "MiG Fury Fighters' North American FJ-4B Fury: The Last of its Kind". Warbird News. 23 August 2013.
- Weiner, Jeff (29 January 2010). "Historic missile launches Orange County man on a quest to find home for it". Orlando Sentinel.
- "Errant Army Missile Takes Mexican Trip". Chicago Tribune. 13 September 1967. p. 14.
- "Hundreds of Thousands Protest Missiles in Europe: Urge U.S. to Match Soviet Halt". Los Angeles Times. 8 April 1985.
- "US Missile Off Course, Hits Mexico". The Milwaukee Journal. 11 September 1967.
- Kempe, Frederick (1 September 1983). "Pershing II Worries Hit a Once-Content German Town" (PDF). Finger Lake Times. Wall Street Journal. p. 5.
- "Nickerson Accuses Wilson Of 'Grave Errors' On Missiles". The Journal and Courier. 28 June 1957. p. B-14.
- "Army Weighs Court-Martial Over Missiles". St. Petersburg Times. 25 February 1957. p. 1.
- "Army's Pershing Missile Guidance Platform Built in Super Clean Room" (PDF). Newsweek. 14 December 1959. p. 81.
- Drozdiak, William (11 November 1984). "U.S. Missile Unit Likes Pershing II". The Washington Post.
- Burr, William (10 December 2009). "Thirtieth Anniversary of NATO's Dual-Track Decision". The National Security Archive.
- Kozin, Vladimir (19 June 2015). "Are Pershing missiles Returning to Europe?". Oriental Review.
- Evans, David (27 December 1987). "Critics Claim Missile That Will Be Scrapped Couldn't Hit Target Anyway". Chicago Tribune.
- "Veterans Remember Soldiers Killed in Pershing Explosion at Waldheide". Stars and Stripes. 9 January 2015.
- "German, US Troops Plan Pershing Firings from Utah" (PDF). The White Sands Missile Ranger. Zia Newspapers. 21 June 1968.
- "Army Confirms Missile Manual was Discarded". Toledo Blade. 23 May 1985. p. 15.
- Bendix (May 1961). "Army's New Shoot and Scoot Missile Scores Success". Fortune. p. 91.
- Thiokol (April 1961). "Reliability in Depth, From Research Through Production". Fortune. pp. 200–201.
- Xiandai Hangkong [Modern Aviation] (in Chinese). Vol. 4. Beijing. 1964. p. 9.
- Ward, John B. (January 1972). "The Pershing Missile Mission - More Than Luck". Army in Europe. PAM 360-1-62.
- Pincus, Walter (16 October 1983). "Pershings Packed to Go". The Washington Post.
- Pruitt, Wendell (July–August 2002). "A Pershing Missilier's Story" (PDF). Cold War Times. 2 (4): 20–24.

== Other ==
- Haddock, Raymond (6 December 2006). "Missiles of the Cold War and the Contribution of Pershing II".
- Fischier, Tony. "Five Presidents". Parker Pens Penography: Parker Special Edition, Special Purpose Edition and Limited Edition.
- Parsch, Andreas (24 December 2002). "Martin Marietta M14/MGM-31 Pershing". Directory of U.S. Military Rockets and Missiles.
- Dodson, Christine (19 August 1978). Response to PRM-38 [Presidential Review Memorandum 38] Long-Range Theater Nuclear Forces (PDF). Special Coordinating Committee, National Security Council. 782245.
- Memorandum of Conversation (PDF). The White House: National Security Council. 25 September 1975.
- Army's Purchase of Pershing Missile Launch System Test Sets From Mohawk Industries, Inc., Easton, Pennsylvania (PDF). Comptroller General of the United States. 16 November 1971. B-163435.
- Treaty Between the United States of America and the Union of Soviet Socialist Republics on the Elimination of Their Intermediate-range and Shorter-range Missiles (INF Treaty). United States Department of State. 8 December 1987.
- Doyle, David (2003). "G-852 M656 Family". Standard Catalog of U.S. Military Vehicles. Krause. pp. 189–192. ISBN 0-87349-508-X.
- History of the Mark 50 Warhead (Report). Sandia National Labs., Albuquerque, NM (USA). January 1968.

== PanzerBaer ==
- Richter, Andreas. "Boden/Boden-Flugkörper Pershing I und Ia (Bw)" [Surface/Surface Missile Pershing I and Ia]. PanzerBaer (in German).
- Richter, Andreas. "Boden/Boden-Flugkörper Pershing Ia (Bw) – Programmier und Prüfstand mit SEA" [Surface/Surface Missile Pershing Ia – Programmer Test Station]. PanzerBaer (in German).
- Richter, Andreas. "Boden/Boden-Flugkörper Pershing Ia (Bw) – Programmier und Prüfstand mit SEA" [Surface/Surface Missile Pershing Ia – Programmer Test Station]. PanzerBaer (in German).
- Richter, Andreas. "Boden/Boden-Flugkörper Pershing Ia (Bw) – Werfer-Fahrzeug" [Surface/Surface Missile Pershing Ia – Erector Launcher]. PanzerBaer (in German).
- Richter, Andreas. "Boden/Boden-Flugkörper Pershing Ia (Bw) – Werfer-Fahrzeug" [Surface/Surface Missile Pershing Ia – Erector Launcher]. PanzerBaer (in German).
- Richter, Andreas. "Boden/Boden-Flugkörper Pershing Ia (Bw) – Funkkoffer mit Troposcatter" [Surface/Surface Missile Pershing Ia – Radio System with Tropospheric Scatter]. PanzerBaer (in German).
- Richter, Andreas. "Lkw 5t tmil gl Geräteträger Radio Termin Set Tropo-Scatter Antenne AN/TRC 80 (Bw)" [Truck 5t Tactical Military Carrier with Radio Terminal Set Tropo-Scattering Antenna AN/TRC 80]. PanzerBaer (in German).
- Richter, Andreas. "Raketensystem Pershing I – H&K87/United Fun (1/87)" [Missile System Pershing I - H&K87/United Fun (1/87)]. PanzerBaer (in German).

== Documentaries ==
=== The Big Picture ===
- "Army Digest Number Nine: Nike Zeus-Pershing". The Big Picture. United States Army. TV-526.
- "Missile Man". The Big Picture. United States Army. TV-384.
- "Pershing Joins the Ranks". The Big Picture. United States Army. 1964. TV-613. Archived from the original on 7 December 2024.
- "The Pershing: Seventh Army Blackjack". The Big Picture. United States Army. TV-712.
- "The Pershing Weapon System". The Big Picture. United States Army. Archived from the original on 10 March 2016.

=== Other ===
- Pershing Development Progress. United States Army. Archived from the original on 12 December 2021.
- Closeup on Weapons for Nuclear Age. British Pathe. 1960.
- Countdown at White Sands. United States Army. 1960.
- President Dwight D Eisenhower Inspects U.S. Army Missile During his Visit at Cape Canaveral, Florida. Universal International News. Universal Pictures. 11 February 1960.
- President Eisenhower and Military Officers Review Two Hundred pieces of Weaponry at Fort Benning in Georgia, United States. Universal International News. Universal Pictures. 5 May 1960.
- President John F. Kennedy's Inauguration Parade. Washington, D.C. 20 January 1961. Event occurs at 5:10. Archived from the original on 12 December 2021.
- United States Army Research and Development - Progress Report Number Three. United States Army. 1961.
- Pershing Missile, Pad 30, Cape Canaveral, Florida. United States Army. 14 June 1961. Archived from the original on 8 March 2016.
- Missile Fired By German Unit. United States Army. 21 April 1964. Archived from the original on 12 December 2021. FKGrp 12 graduation firing at Fort Bliss, Texas. AO-12 X-77.
- MGM-31 Pershing Guided Missile System 1965 US Army; Weapons of the Field Artillery. United States Army. 1965. Archived from the original on 4 February 2017.
- "Pershing Guided Missile System". Weapons of the Field Artillery. United States Army. 1965. TF6-3646.
- Missile Flight Safety for Off Range Firings into White Sands Missile Range. United States Army. 1967.
- Pershing Missile Safety and Performance Monitoring. United States Army. 1967. Archived from the original on 30 October 2014.
- MGM-31 Pershing 1A missile. United States Army. Archived from the original on 12 December 2021.
- Pershing: A Decade of Progress — Part 1. United States Army. Archived from the original on 12 December 2021.
- Pershing: A Decade of Progress — Part 2. United States Army. Archived from the original on 12 December 2021.
- Pershing 1a. United States Army. 1977. Archived from the original on 20 April 2016.
- Pershing II— Position of Strength. United States Army. Archived from the original on 12 December 2021.
- MGM-31 Pershing II missile. United States Army. Archived from the original on 12 December 2021.
- 56th Field Artillery Brigade. United States Army. 1983.
- 56th FA BDE (Pershing). United States Army. 1983.
- 56th FA CMD Change of Command. United States Army. August 1987. Archived from the original on 12 December 2021.
- West Germany Anti-Nuclear Demonstration at Mutlangen. AP Archive. 6 August 1985. Archived from the original on 12 December 2021 – via YouTube.
- Seniorenblockade in Mutlangen vom 08. - 10. Mai 1986. 10 May 1986. Archived from the original on 12 December 2021.
- Presidential Visit. White Sands Missile Range. 5 June 1963. Event occurs at 10:20. M.F.45 9524.
- Classix: NATO-Übung Black Jack [NATO Exercise Black Jack] (in German). 1973. Archived from the original on 12 December 2021.
- Geiger, Lance (14 January 2020). Able Archer and the World's Most Dangerous Year.

== Photos ==
- Del Tredici, Robert (15 October 1986). Terminal Guidance. At Work in the Fields of the Bomb. Archived from the original on 4 March 2016 – via NuclearFiles.org.

=== Walkarounds ===
- Lueck, David. MGM-31 Pershing I with M474 TEL Walk Around. Prime Portal.
- Lueck, David. MGM-31A Pershing IA Erector Launcher Walk Around. Prime Portal.
- Lueck, David. Pershing II – Walk Around. Net-Maquettes.
- Lueck, David. Pershing II Erector Launcher Walk Around. Prime Portal.

== Audio ==
- Mack, Robert. "U.S. Army Pershing Missile Launch". Living Sound Effects, Volume 3. Bainbridge Entertainment. BCD2003.

== Fiction ==
=== Novels ===
- Acuña, Gregory M. (2024). Double Snare: A Cold War Thriller. ISBN 978-1-734-23868-6. A US Army officer attempts to sell Pershing II missile technology to the East Germans.
- Canon, Jack (1985). The Normandy Code: Nick Carter Killmaster #202. Diamond. ISBN 978-0-441-58612-7. Nick Carter must retrieve a plaster Madonna containing the computer codes of all the Pershing missiles.
- Davis, Tom (2022). Empty Quiver. ASIN B09YQGKC7R. The KGB resists Pershing II missiles being deployed in West Germany.
- Evans, Linda (1994). Sleipnir. Baen. ISBN 0-671-87594-9. The first few chapters are based on the real-life experiences of a Pershing missile guard with the 2nd Battalion, 4th Infantry Regiment.
- Hagberg, David (1990). Countdown. Tor. ISBN 978-0-8125-0964-9. The codes for Pershing missiles based at Ramstein Air Base are stolen.
- Montgomery, R. A. (1990). Trio: Rebels in the New World: Almost Lost. Starfire. ISBN 978-0-553-28462-1. In post-apocalyptic America of 2015, a would be dictator uses seven National Guard Pershing 1 missiles painted red to attack Denver.
- Mudrick, Victor (2002). In the Wrong Hands. Xlibris. ISBN 978-1-4628-1896-9. A Pershing missile escaped destruction during the Intermediate-Range Nuclear Forces Treaty elimination and terrorists use it to threaten London.
- Niven, Larry; Pournelle, Jerry (1985). Footfall. Del Rey. ISBN 978-0-345-32344-6. During an alien invasion, Pershing missiles are retargeted to attack an orbiting ship.
- Portmann, H.H. (2024). Adios El Jefe!. ISBN 979-8369414972. Cuban refugees enlist in the US Army to use a Pershing 1s missile to assassinate Castro.

=== Film ===
- Bernds, Edward (director) (1962). The Three Stooges in Orbit. There are two short scenes with a Pershing 1 at 1:17:06 and 1:18:51.
- Hughes, John (1985). Weird Science. Event occurs at 56:50. A Pershing II missile is created from 31 January 1983 cover of Time.
- Scott, Tony (director) (1995). Crimson Tide. Event occurs at 4:19. Cmdr. Hunter is watching the news when the newscaster states "Threatened to use nuclear arms on the United States and Japan... should anyone, including the Russian Army, attempt to move in on him." The missile being erected is a Pershing II.
- Anderson, Wes (director) (1998). Rushmore. Event occurs at 1:33. The character is wearing the inverted insignia of the 56th Field Artillery Command.
- Levy, Shawn (director) (2009). Night at the Museum: Battle of the Smithsonian. Event occurs at 1:02. The scene at the National Air and Space Museum includes prop versions of the Pershing II and SS-20 missiles.

=== Television ===
- Moder, Dick (director) (21 April 1978). "The Murderous Missile". Wonder Woman. Wonder Woman must stop the hijacking of an experimental thought controlled missile. The missile prop is an Estes model rocket Pershing.
- Roh, Mike (director) (2011). "Liftoff". Eureka. Event occurs at 12:28. The interceptor missile launch is U.S. Army footage of a Pershing 1a missile launch.
- Deutschland 83. 2015. The series is set in 1983 West Germany during the Pershing II deployment. Series opening includes a Pershing 1a being erected.
- The First Lady. 2022. Event occurs at 0:55. Series opening includes a Pershing 1a being erected.

=== Music ===
- Geier Sturzflug (1983). "Besuchen Sie Europa (solange es noch steht)" [Visit Europe (While It's Still Standing)]. Heiße Zeiten [Hot Times] (in German). The first verse ends with "And a Pershing II rises from the Olympus Range"
- Krokus (1986). Change of Address. The gatefold photo has four of the band members wearing the insignia of the 56th Field Artillery Command.

=== Music videos ===
- Cash, Johnny; Lester, Butch (writer) (1991). "Goin' By The Book". The Mystery of Life. Universal Music Group. Event occurs at 2:05. Archived from the original on 12 December 2021. The missile is a Pershing 1a being erected with a timestamp of 13 November 1979. The scene occurs after the line "There's armies in the cities and the missiles stand ready for flight."

== Artwork ==
- Duncan, Wayne (1960). Pershing Missile in Winter. Archived from the original on 14 December 2007.
- U.S. Army Encampment. Martin.
- Pritchett, C. B. German Air Force Pershing 1b launch. Martin Marietta.
- Pritchett, C. B. U.S Army Pershing II. Martin Marietta.
- Finley, George (1988). The Final Countdown. Archived from the original on 4 March 2016.
  - The Blackjack Pershing Chapter of the United States Artillery Association Presents the Commemorative Painting Pershing II— The Final Countdown by George Finley (PDF) (Booklet). 1988.
  - George Finley is a military artist who was the commander of the 74th U.S. Army Field Artillery Detachment, supporting Missile Wing 1 of the German Air Force. In 1988, the Blackjack Pershing Chapter of the United States Field Artillery Association commissioned a painting to commemorate the decommissioning of the Pershing system. 501 signed prints of The Final Countdown were created. The print is now available for sale again through his website.
- Tsereteli, Zurab (1990). Good Defeats Evil.
  - Tsereteli created a sculpture using sections of scrapped US Pershing and Soviet SS-20 nuclear missiles. The sculpture, entitled Good Defeats Evil is a 39 foot high, 40 ton monumental bronze statue of St George fighting the dragon of nuclear war. It was donated to the UN by the Soviet Union in 1990 and placed on the grounds of the UN headquarters in New York City. A series of works based on the sculpture that also incorporated scrap from the missiles were released in a limited series of 160 each.
  - Good Defeats Evil (PDF) (Brochure). Universal Art Corporation. 1990.
  - A 39-inch-tall sculpture
  - An enamel plaque with a copper back
  - Bronze medallion
  - The INF Treaty Missile Commemorative uses missile shards with a 7½ bronze medallion

== Memorabilia ==
=== World Memorial Fund for Disaster Relief ===
Leonard Cheshire created the World Memorial Fund for Disaster Relief in 1990. The charity obtained Pershing and SS-20 scrap material and created memorabilia for fund raising.

- World Memorial Fund for Disaster Relief badge. 1991. The badge is the group logo, a World War I whistle.
- World Memorial Pens. Parker Pen Company. 1991.
  - Parker created the World Memorial Pens, a series of pens and mechanical pencils with a Memorial Fund badge on the crown or clip, with half the proceeds going to the fund.
  - Duofold Black International Fountain Pen
  - Duofold Black International Ball Pen
  - Duofold Black International Fountain Pen and Ball Pen; 90192
  - Sonnet Fountain Pen
  - Laque Black Ball Pen; 81632
  - Laque Black Ball Pen and Mechanical Pencil
  - Stainless GT Ball Pen; 81732
  - Stainless GT Ball Pen and Mechanical Pencil
  - 14K Dimonite G Ball Pen; 81532
  - 14K Dimonite G Ball Pen and Mechanical Pencil
- Five Presidents Pen. Parker. 1991.
  - On 4 November 1991 the Ronald Reagan Presidential Library opened in Simi Valley, California. The then five living presidents, Richard Nixon, Gerald Ford, George H. W. Bush, Jimmy Carter and Ronald Reagan were present at the opening. Parker presented each with a black ballpoint Duofold Centennial with the Presidential Seal on the crown formed from scrap material and the barrel engraved with signatures of the presidents. The pen was also offered in a walnut box with the names of all five presidents and the Presidential Seal.

== Other ==
- Missile Age Interlocking Picture Puzzle. Jaymar. 5034.
