= 59th Ordnance Brigade =

Brigade of the United States Army

- 59th Ordnance Brigade shoulder sleeve insignia
- Active: 1955–1992; 1994 – present
- Country: United States
- Allegiance: Ordnance Corps
- Branch: United States Army
- Role: Ordnance Training
- Size: Brigade
- Part of: U.S. Army Ordnance School
- Garrison/HQ: Fort Gregg-Adams, Virginia
- Website: goordance

Commanders
- Current Commander: COL Eldred K. Ramtahal
- Command Sergeant Major: CSM George Camarena

Insignia
- Distinctive Unit Insignia

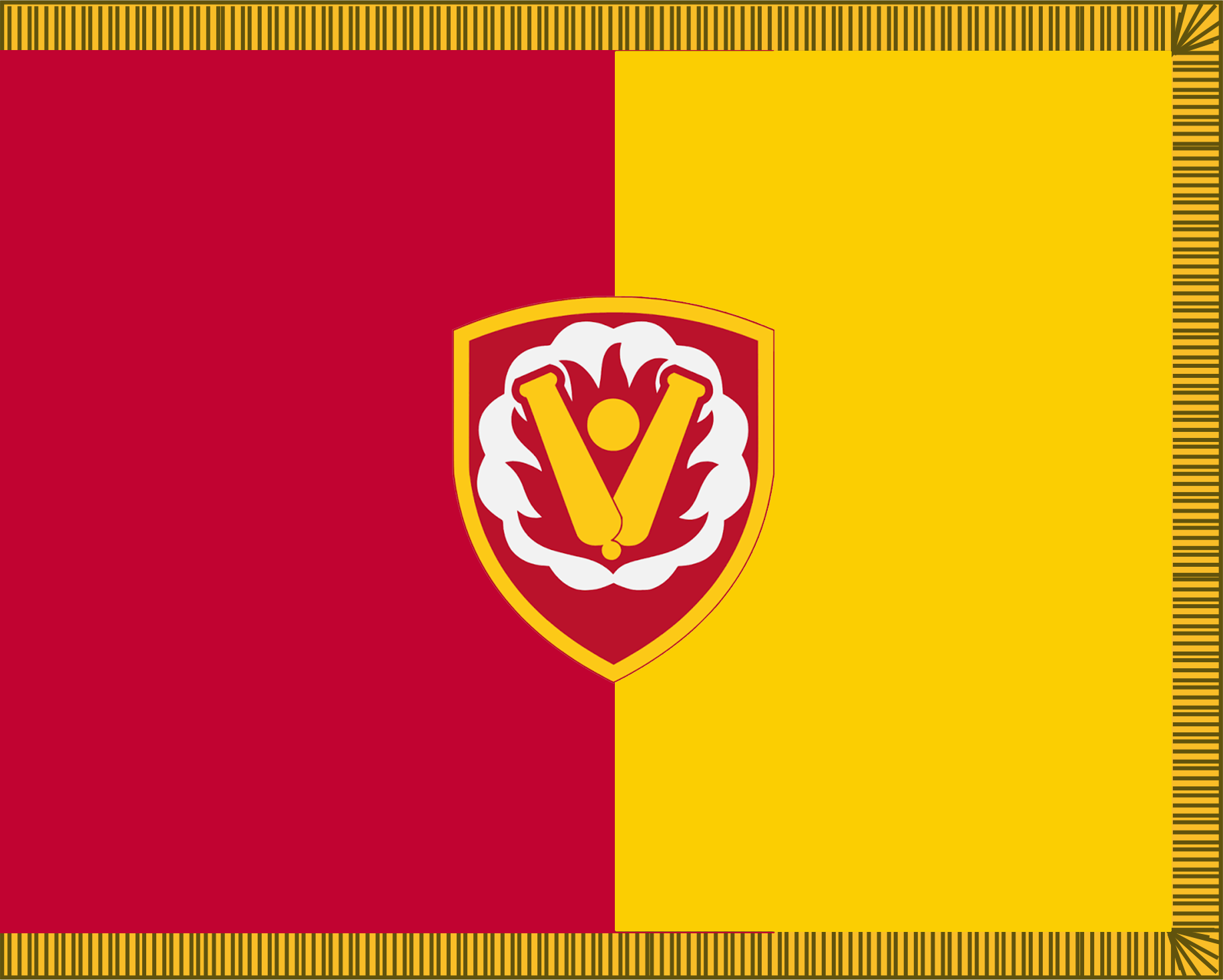
- 59th Ordnance Brigade Flag

The 59th Ordnance Brigade is a military unit of the United States Army. The unit is currently stood up as the U.S. Army Ordnance School's training brigade. In its previous iteration, the brigade had more than 6,500 soldiers. It was responsible for storage, delivering, maintaining, Nuclear and Chemical Control Orders, and supervising the weapons of mass destruction ("special ammo" of Nuclear and Chemical Munitions) for U.S. Forces and Forces of the Allied NATO-Countries, except France.

== Heraldry ==
=== Shoulder sleeve insignia ===
- Blazon: on a shield 2 1/2 inches (6.4 cm) in width and 3 inches (7.6 cm) in height overall, crimson with a 1/8 inch (0.32 cm) yellow border, a white disc with scalloped rim containing a crimson flame of nine tongues surmounted by a small yellow disc at upper center between two cannon barrels in a V position, their breeches conjoined in base.
- Symbolism: crimson and yellow are the colors used for ordnance. The cannon barrels represent weapons, the disc at center a round of shot or ammunition, and the flames suggest ordnance repairs. The white area, suggesting a cloud of smoke, alludes to explosives. The position of the cannon barrels simulating the Roman numeral five, together with the nine tongues of the flame, alludes to the organization's numerical designation.
- Background: The shoulder sleeve insignia was approved on 18 April 1980. (TIOH Dwg. No. A-1-655)

=== Distinctive unit insignia ===
- Blazon: A gold color metal and enamel device 1 1/4 inches (3.18 cm) in height consisting of a red dragon's foreleg with scales outlined gold and five claws at the left, bent at the elbow in center base and having on its shoulder at right a Korean Taeguk in red and blue; centered behind the dragon's leg between a blue arch at the top extending from shoulder to claws of the dragon leg and inscribed in gold with the words "power to spare" and in base a wavy blue band terminating at the claws and shoulder of the dragon leg, a gold castle tower with red pointed roof top.
- Symbolism: Crimson and gold are the colors of the Ordnance Corps. The unit's World War II service in the Central Europe and Rhineland campaigns is represented by the castle tower and the wavy band in base, and the general configuration of the tower is an allusion to ordnance materiel. The dragon leg is adapted from designs found on Korean artifacts, its five claws referring to the number of Korean campaign credits and the Taeguk symbol on its shoulder denoting a Meritorious Unit Citation for Korean service.
- Background: The distinctive unit insignia was originally approved for the 59th Ordnance Group on 12 May 1969. It was redesignated for the 59th Ordnance Brigade on 8 March 1978.

== History ==
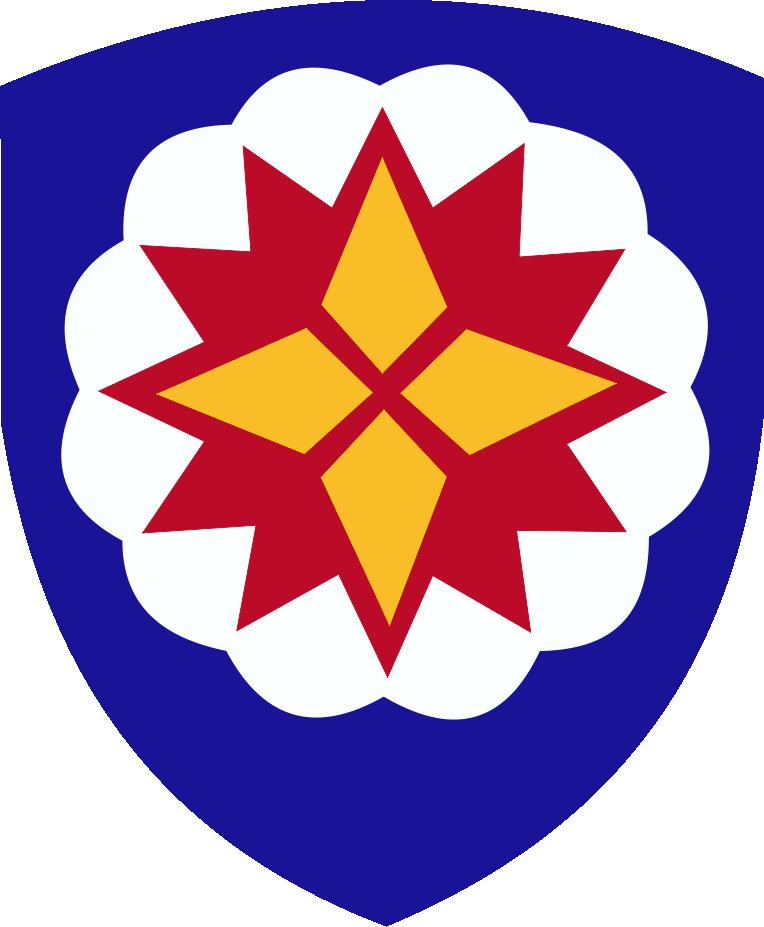
SASCOM

The 71st Ordnance Battalion was activated in Germany in 1955. In 1959, it was reformed into the Advanced Weapons Support Command (AWSCOM). On 24 March 1962 it was renamed as the Special Ammunition Support Command (SASCOM). In October 1972 the name was changed to the Special Ammunition Support Brigade. The Special Ammunition Support Brigade was them reformed into the 59th Ordnance Brigade.

In June 1992, the 59th Ordnance Brigade was inactivated after it had removed all U.S. Army nuclear (SALT, START, Intermediate Range Nuclear Forces (INF)Treaty) and Chemical Weapons (Operation Steel Box and Operation Golden Python) from Europe including Italy, Greece and Turkey as SETAF (Southern European Task Force).

The 59th Ordnance Brigade was reactivated in 1994 at Redstone Arsenal, Alabama, and replaced the School Brigade that administratively served the Ordnance Missile and Munitions Center and School (OMMCS). The brigade moved to Fort Lee, Virginia in 2011 and the school was merged into the United States Army Ordnance Corps and School.

== Overview ==
In June 1976 the brigade's units were situated at many locations in Western Germany and The Netherlands: In October 1978 the 5th U.S. Army Artillery Group was reorganized as the 59th Ordnance Brigade all air defense detachment group. Custodial units in Italy, Greece and Turkey were controlled by Southern European Task Force (SETAF) in Vicenza, Caserma Ederle (Italy).

| Unit | Location | Remark |
|---|---|---|
| Headquarters and headquarters company, 59th Ordnance Brigade | Husterhöh-Kaserne, Pirmasens | |
| United States Army Permissive Action Link Detachment | Husterhöh-Kaserne, Pirmasens | |
| 563rd Ordnance Company (Maintenance) (General Supply) | Camp Pieri, Wiesbaden | Reassigned to 3rd Ordnance Battalion |
| 579th Ordnance Company (General Maintenance) | Nelson Barracks, Neu-Ulm | Reassigned to 3rd Ordnance Battalion |
| 165th Signal Company | Husterhöh-Kaserne, Pirmasens | |
| 41st Ordnance Company (Ammunition Conventional) | Kaiserslautern | Reassigned to 3rd Ordnance Battalion |
| 22nd Aviation Detachment | Husterhöh-Kaserne, Pirmasens | |
| 3rd United States Army Ordnance Battalion (Theater Support) | | |
| HHC, 3rd Ordnance Battalion | Husterhöh-Kaserne, Pirmasens | Previously 1977 to 1991 Special Troops Battalion, Theater Support Battalion |
| 9th Ordnance Company (Special Ammunition) (Theater Support, DS/GS) | Miesau Army Depot | Reassigned to 3rd Ordnance Battalion from 72nd |
| 164th Military Police Company (Physical Security) | Miesau Ammunition Depot | Reassigned to 3rd Ordnance Battalion from 72nd |
| 330th Ordnance Company (Chemical Munitions) | Site 59 Clausen, Admin HQ Muenchweiller Kaserne | Operation Steel Box and Operation Golden Python |
| 110th Military Police Company (Physical Security) | Site 59 Clausen, Admin HQ Muenchweiller Kaserne | Operation Steel Box and Operation Golden Python |
| 41st Ordnance Company (Ammunition Conventional) | Rhine Ordnance Barracks Kaiserslautern | Reassigned to 3rd Ordnance Battalion |
| 41st Ord Det (Conventional Munitions and Lance Missiles) | Fischbach Army Depot | Reassigned to 3rd Ordnance Battalion |
| 563rd Ordnance Company (Maintenance) (General Supply) | Camp Pieri, Wiesbaden | Reassigned to 3rd Ordnance Battalion |
| 579th Ordnance Company (General Maintenance) | Nelson Barracks, Neu-Ulm | Reassigned to 3rd Ordnance Battalion |
| 4th Ordnance Company (GM Maintenance) | Army Depot, Miesau | Reassigned to 3rd Ordnance Battalion |
| 72nd United States Army Ordnance Battalion (Ammunition) | | |
| HHD, 72nd Ordnance Battalion | Army Depot, Miesau | |
| 4th Ordnance Company (GM Maintenance) | Army Depot, Miesau | Reassigned to 3rd Ordnance Battalion |
| 6th Military Police Company (Physical Security) | NATO 111, Muenster-Dieburg (Muna) Kaserne | |
| 9th Ordnance Company (Special Ammunition) (Theater Support, DS/GS) | Army Depot, Miesau | Reassigned to 3rd Ordnance Battalion |
| 164th Military Police Company (Physical Security) | NATO 104, Ammunition Depot, Miesau | Reassigned to 3rd Ordnance Battalion |
| 545th Ordnance Company (Maintenance) | NATO 111, Muenster-Dieburg (Muna) Kaserne | One of the ten main nuclear storage sites in Germany |
| 619th Ordnance Company (Special Ammunition) (Dep Spt) | Ammunition Depot, Kriegsfeld | One of the ten main nuclear storage sites in Germany |
| 558th Military Police Company (Physical Security) | Ammunition Depot, Kriegsfeld | |
| 197th United States Army Ordnance Battalion (Ammunition) | | |
| HHD, 197th Ordnance Battalion | Fischbach-Kaserne, Fischbach | One of the ten main nuclear storage sites in Germany |
| 64th Ordnance Company (Special Ammunition) (DS/GS) | Fischbach Kaserne, Fischbach | Alternate to the Theater Support Mission of 9th Ordnance Company |
| 165th Military Police Company (Physical Security) | Fischbach Kaserne, Fischbach | |
| 525th Ordnance Company (Special Ammunition) (Dep Spt) | Ordnance Area, Siegelsbach | One of the ten main nuclear storage sites in Germany |
| 556th Military Police Company (Physical Security) | Ordnance Area, Siegelsbach | |
| 5th United States Army Artillery Group (Wh Spt) | | |
| HHD, 5th United States Artillery Group | Stöckerbusch-Kaserne, Büren | Activated 22 July 1962 at Fort Sill, Oklahoma. Reorganized as all air defense artillery group in 1978. Stöckerbusch-Kaserne was a Belgian host-nation barracks on German soil (Caserne Cortemarck), guarded by Dutch troops. Inactivated 15 October 1988 in Germany |
| 27th Ordnance Company (Special Ammunition) (GS) | Stöckerbusch-Kaserne, Büren | One of the ten main nuclear storage sites in Germany |
| 4th United States Army Field Artillery Detachment (Msl Wh Spt) (HJ) | Caserne Houthulst, Werl | Reassigned in 1978 to 570th USAAG. Supported unit: 3rd (BE) Arty Regt (LANCE and 155 mm, 203 mm) |
| 33rd United States Army Field Artillery Detachment (Msl Wh Spt) (HJ) | Caserne Moorslede, Cologne-Dellbrück | Reassigned in 1978 to 570th USAAG. Supported unit: (BE) Arty Cmd, Cologne-Weiden |
| 43rd Air Defense Detachment (Msl Wh Spt) | Camp Bodart, Düren-Drove | Remained with 5th USAAG in 1978. Supported unit: Belgian NIKE Bn (13e Wing Missiles), 4 teams in Nideggen, Bedburg, Euskirchen, Blankenheim |
| 66th Air Defense Detachment (Msl Wh Spt) | Herzog-Johann-von-Cleve-Kaserne, Soest-Büecke | Remained with 5th USAAG in 1978. Supported unit: German NIKE Bn (FlaRakBtl 21), 4 teams in Möhnesee-Echtrop, Warendorf, Holzwickede, Datteln |
| 85th United States Army Field Artillery Detachment (Msl Wh Spt) (HJ) | Selfkant-Kaserne, Geilenkirchen | Reassigned in 1978 to 557th USAAG. Supported unit: (GE) Pershing I A |
| 507th Air Defense Detachment (Msl Wh Spt) | Camp Hinsbeck, Grefrath (new name: Nettetal) | Remained with 5th USAAG in 1978. Supported unit: Belgian NIKE Bn (9e Wing Missiles), 4 teams in Grefrath, Raesfeld, Grevenbroich, Xanten |
| 508th Air Defense Detachment (Msl Wh Spt) | Handorf Kaserne, Münster-Handorf | Remained with 5th USAAG in 1978. Supported unit: 2 Dutch NIKE Bn (1 Groep Geleide Wapens (GGW), 2 GGW), 4 teams in Handorf, Schermbeck, Bad Essen, Bramsche-Hesepe |
| 294th Artillery Group (Wh Spt) | | |
| HHD, 294th United States Army Artillery Group | Briesen-Kaserne, Flensburg | Activated 1 May 1966 in Germany. Supported unit: LANDJUT. Inactivated 15 June 1992 in Germany |
| 99th Ordnance Detachment (Wh Spt) | Flensburg | |
| 13th United States Army Field Artillery Detachment (Msl Wh Spt) (HJ) | Liliencron-Kaserne, Kellinghusen | SAS Kellinghusen. One of the ten main nuclear storage sites in Germany. Supported unit: (GE) 6th InfDiv, Neumünster |
| 51st United States Army Field Artillery Detachment (Msl Wh Spt) | Freiherr-von-Fritsch-Kaserne, Itzehoe | Supported unit: (GE) RakArtBtl 650 (LANCE). Reflagged as 51st USAAD in Adelheide (5th USAAG) |
| 75th United States Army Field Artillery Detachment (Msl Wh Spt) (HJ) | Freiherr-von-Fritsch-Kaserne, Itzehoe | Supported unit: (GE) RakArtBtl 650 (LANCE), 1963 - 1975 |
| 512th United States Army Artillery Group (Wh Spt) | | |
| HHD, 512th United States Army Artillery Group | Prinz-Eugen-Kaserne, Günzburg | Activated 24 March 1962 at Fort Sill, Oklahoma. Supported unit: (GE) II Corps, Ulm. Inactivated 15 June 1992 in Germany. |
| 510th Ordnance Company (Special Ammunition) (GS) | Günzburg (SAS Riedheim) | One of the ten main nuclear storage sites in Germany |
| 2nd United States Army Field Artillery Detachment (Msl Wh Spt) (HJ) | Generaloberst-von-Fritsch-Kaserne, Pfullendorf | Supported unit: 10th (GE) ArmorDiv, Sigmaringen, (GE) RakArtBtl 102, Pfullendorf |
| 24th United States Army Field Artillery Detachment (Msl Wh Spt) (HJ) | Generalfeldmarschall-von-Leeb-Kaserne, Landsberg | Supported unit: 1st (GE) Mountain Div, Garmisch-Partenkirchen, GebRakArtBtl 82, Landsberg; (GE) Pershing I A |
| 36th United States Army Field Artillery Detachment (Msl Wh Spt) (HJ) | General-von-Steuben-Kaserne, Hemau | Supported unit: (GE) 4th InfDiv, Regensburg, (GE) RakArtBtl 42, Hemau |
| 74th United States Army Field Artillery Detachment (Msl Wh Spt) (HJ) | Air Base, Lechfeld | Supported unit: (GE) Missile Wing, Saarburg-Kaserne, Landsberg (Pershing I A) |
| 82nd United States Army Field Artillery Detachment (Msl Wh Spt) | Air Base, Lechfeld, 1969 Lagerlechfeld (Obermeitingen) | In 1975 82nd USAFAD merged with 74th USAFAD |
| 84th United States Army Field Artillery Detachment (Msl Wh Spt) (HJ) | Eberhard-Finckh-Kaserne, Großengstingen | Supported unit: 2nd (GE) Arty Cmd, RakArtBtl 250, Großengstingen |
| 514th United States Army Artillery Group | JHQ Rheindahlen, Mönchengladbach (Germany) | Activated 1 December 1961 in Germany. Staff element at NORTHAG. Inactivated 20 October 1972 in Germany. Headquarters and Headquarters Detachment (HHD) of the subordinate to the Special Ammunition Support Command (SASCOM) mission was the implementation of the SASCOM Special Ammunition Support Program and Second Allied Tactical Air Force (2ATAF). SASCOM was deactivated in October 1972 with the merger of SASCOM and AWSCOM, the personnel and spaces made available from the deactivation were used to establish the 59th Ordnance Group Staff Element at NORTHAG. The staff element at NORTHAG was inactivated in April 1992. |
| 548th United States Army Artillery Group | Campbell Barracks, Heidelberg (Germany) | Activated 2 October 1961 in Germany. Staff element at CENTAG. Inactivated 20 October 1972 in Germany |
| 552nd United States Army Artillery Group (Wh Spt) | | |
| HHD, 552nd United States Army Artillery Group | Mühlenberg-Kaserne, Sögel | Activated 20 October 1959 at Fort Sill, Oklahoma. Supported unit: I (GE) Corps, Münster and 1st (NL) Corps, Apeldoorn (Netherlands). Inactivated 15 June 1992 in Germany. |
| 162nd Ordnance Company (Special Ammunition) (GS) | Mühlenberg-Kaserne, Sögel (SAS Lahn) | One of the ten main nuclear storage sites in Germany |
| 1st United States Army Field Artillery Detachment (Msl Wh Spt) (HJ) | Schill-Kaserne, Wesel | Supported unit: 1st (GE) Arty Cmd, RakArtBtl 150, Wesel (LANCE). Brigade *TACOPS* Champion 1988 |
| 5th United States Army Field Artillery Detachment (Msl Wh Spt) | Dünsen | Supported unit: 11th (GE) InfDiv, Oldenburg, ArtRgt 11, RakArtBtl 112, Delmenhorst-Adelheide |
| 8th United States Army Field Artillery Detachment (Msl Wh Spt) (HJ) | Johan Post Kazerne, Steenwijk, Netherlands | Supported unit: 109th (NL) Field Arty Bn (Honest John), 129th (NL) Field Arty Bn (LANCE) |
| 23rd United States Army Field Artillery Detachment (Msl Wh Spt) (HJ) | Tonnet Kazerne, 't Harde, Netherlands | Supported unit: 19th (NL) Field Arty Bn (M 110), 107th (NL) Field Arty Bn (M 107) |
| 25th United States Army Field Artillery Detachment (Msl Wh Spt) (HJ) | Niedersachsen-Kaserne, Barme (Dörverden) | Supported unit: 3rd (GE) ArmorDiv, Buxtehude, 3rd (GE) ArtRgt, Stade, RakArtBtl 32, Dörverden |
| 32nd United States Army Field Artillery Detachment (Msl Wh Spt) (HJ) | Clausewitz-Kaserne, Nienburg | Supported unit: 1st (GE) ArmorDiv, Hannover, 1st (GE) ArtRgt, Hannover, RakArtBtl 12, Nienburg |
| 35th Air Defense Detachment (Msl Wh Spt) | Wangerland-Kaserne, Hohenkirchen | Reassigned in 1978 to 5th USAAG. Supported unit: German NIKE Bn (FlaRakBtl 26), 4 teams in Medems, Rodenkirchen, Wiesmoor, Dornum |
| 42nd Air Defense Detachment (Msl Wh Spt) | Hülsmeyer-Kaserne, Barnstorf | Reassigned in 1978 to 5th USAAG. Supported unit: German NIKE Bn (FlaRakBtl 25), 4 teams in Schweringhausen, Wagenfeld, Lohne (Oldenburg), Garrel |
| 51st Air Defense Detachment (Msl Wh Spt) | Feldwebel-Lilienthal-Kaserne, Adelheide | Reassigned in 1978 to 5th USAAG. Reflagged from 51st USAFAD, Itzehoe. Supported unit: German NIKE Bn (FlaRakBtl 24), 4 teams in Elsfleth, Ganderkesee, Edewecht-Westerscheps, Syke-Ristedt |
| 81st United States Army Field Artillery Detachment (Msl Wh Spt) | St. Barbara Kaserne, Dülmen | Supported unit: 7th (GE) ArmorDiv, Unna, 7th (GE) ArtRgt, Dülmen, RakArtBtl 72, Wuppertal |
| 557th United States Army Artillery Group (Wh Spt) | | |
| HHD, 557th United States Army Artillery Group | Aartalkaserne, Herbornseelbach | Activated 23 December 1965 at Fort Sill, Oklahoma. Supported unit: III (GE) Corps, Koblenz. Inactivated 15 June 1992 in Germany. |
| 96th Ordnance Company (Special Ammunition) (GS) | Aartalkaserne, Herbornseelbach | The storage site was situated at Bellersdorf. The storage site was surrounded by a pine forest and isolated. One of the ten main nuclear storage sites in Germany. |
| 3rd United States Army Field Artillery Detachment (Msl Wh Spt) (HJ) | Salm-Kaserne, Philippsburg | Supported unit: 12th (GE) ArmorDiv, Veitshöchheim, 12th (GE) ArtRgt, Tauberbischofsheim, RakArtBtl 122, Philippsburg |
| 7th United States Army Field Artillery Detachment (Msl Wh Spt) (HJ) | Harthberg Kaserne, Treysa (new name: Schwalmstadt) | Supported unit: 2nd (GE) InfDiv, Kassel, 2nd (GE) ArtRgt, Marburg, RakArtBtl 22, Treysa |
| 30th United States Army Field Artillery Detachment (Msl Wh Spt) (HJ) | Von Steuben Barracks, Giessen | Supported unit: 5th (GE) ArmorDiv, Diez, 5th (GE) ArtRgt, Diez, RakArtBtl 52, Giessen |
| 52nd Air Defense Detachment (Msl Wh Spt) | Siegerland-Kaserne, Burbach | Reassigned in 1978 to 5th USAAG. Supported unit: German NIKE Bn (FlaRakBtlt 22), 4 teams in Lipper Höhe, Lennestadt-Ödingen, Waldbröl, Marienheide |
| 83rd United States Army Field Artillery Detachment (Msl Wh Spt) (HJ) | Westerwald-Kaserne, Montabaur | Supported unit: 3rd (GE) Arty Cmd, RakArtBtl 350 LANCE), Montabaur |
| 501st Air Defense Detachment (Msl Wh Spt) | Nidder-Kaserne, Kilianstädten (new name: Schöneck) | Reassigned in 1978 to 5th USAAG. Supported unit: German NIKE Bn (FlaRakBtl 23), 4 teams in Kilianstädten, Lich, Westerburg, Kemel |
| 570th United States Army Artillery Group (Wh Spt) | | |
| HHD, 570th United States Army Artillery Group | Simpson Barracks (UK), Münster | Activated 24 February 1964 at Fort Sill, Oklahoma. Supported unit: 1 (BR) Corps, Bielefeld and 1 (BE) Corps, Cologne-Weiden. Inactivated 15 June 1992 in Germany. |
| 583rd Ordnance Company (Special Ammunition) (GS) | Simpson Barracks (UK), Münster (SAS Telgte-Schirlheide) | One of the ten main nuclear storage sites in Germany |
| 9th United States Army Field Artillery Detachment (Msl Wh Spt) | Northumberland Barracks (UK), Menden | |
| 15th United States Army Field Artillery Detachment (Msl Wh Spt) (HJ) | Barker Barracks (UK), Paderborn | Supported unit: 5th (BR) Heavy Regt, 24th (BR) Msl Regt, Paderborn (155 mm arty). 15th USAFAD was stationed in Villingen from 1960 - 1966 (576th USAAG) |
| 22nd United States Army Field Artillery Detachment (Msl Wh Spt) (HJ) | Dempsey Barracks (UK), Sennelager (Schloss Neuhaus) | Supported unit: 39th (BR) Fld regt, 39th (BR) Msl Regt, Sennelager (203 mm nuclear) |
| 26th United States Army Field Artillery Detachment (Msl Wh Spt) | Barker Barracks (UK), Paderborn | Supported unit: 27th (BR) Guided Weapons Regt, 47th (BR) Guided Weapons Regt, Dortmund (155 mm nuclear); Royal Canadian Arty 1960 - 1967 |
| 69th United States Army Field Artillery Detachment (Msl Wh Spt) (HJ) | Peninsula Barracks (UK), Hemer | Supported unit: 50th (BR) Msl Regt (LANCE), Menden; Royal Canadian Arty 1960 - 1967 |
| 81st United States Army Field Artillery Detachment (Msl Wh Spt) (HJ) | Dülmen | |
| 501st Air Defense Detachment (Msl Wh Spt) | Nidder-Kaserne, Kilianstädten | Reassigned in 1978 to 5th USAAG. Supported unit: German NIKE Bn (FlaRakBtl 23), 4 teams in Kilianstädten, Lich, Westerburg, Kemel |
| 528th United States Army Artillery Group | | |
| HHD, 528th United States Army Artillery Group | Cakmakli HQ complex (Turkey) | Activated 1 April 1959 at Fort Sill, Oklahoma. 1972 control by SETAF. Supported unit: (TR) Army Artillery and Air Defense. Inactivated 15 July 1992 in Germany. |
| 10th United States Army Field Artillery Detachment (Msl Wh Spt) (SH) | Corlu E Garrison, NIKE Ortaköy (Turkey) | |
| 14th United States Army Field Artillery Detachment (Msl Wh Spt) (HJ) | Izmit, Koseköy Garrison (Turkey) | |
| 21st United States Army Field Artillery Detachment (Msl Wh Spt) (SH) | Corlu E Garrison, NIKE Corlu (Turkey) | |
| 27th United States Army Field Artillery Detachment (Msl Wh Spt) (SH) | Erzurum, NIKE Erzurum (Turkey) | |
| 558th United States Army Artillery Group | | The 558th USAAG operated 10 sites, including a central storage site near Elefsis. SW warheads under the group's control: HJ 66, 8-inch howitzer 48, NIKE 30 (remaining 24 warheads belonged to the Air Force at Araxos AB) |
| HHD, 558th United States Army Artillery Group | Elefsis (Greece) | Activated 20 May 1960 at Fort Sill, Oklahoma. 1972 control by SETAF. Supported unit: (GR) Army Artillery and Hellenic Air Force. Inactivated 15 September 1992 in Germany. |
| 18th United States Army Field Artillery Detachment (Msl Wh Spt) (SH) | Argyroupolis (Greece) | Supported unit: Honest John. 1960 - 1988 |
| 19th United States Army Field Artillery Detachment (Msl Wh Spt) (SH) | Perivolaki (Greece) | Supported unit: Honest John. 1960 - 1988 |
| 70th United States Army Field Artillery Detachment (Msl Wh Spt) (HJ) | Yiannitsa (Greece) | Supported unit: 8 inch howitzer, 1960 - 1985 |
| 88th United States Army Field Artillery Detachment (Msl Wh Spt) | Drama (Greece) | Supported unit: Honest John. 1960 - 1985 |
| 37th United States Air Defense Detachment | Keratea / Katsimidi (Greece) | Supported unit: Greek NIKE Bn (350th Squadron), 4 teams in Keratea, Koropi, Katsimidi, Erithea (Kreokouki) |
| 76th United States Air Defense Detachment | Koropi (Greece) | Supported unit: Greek NIKE Bn |
| 78th United States Air Defense Detachment | Katsimidi (Greece) | Supported unit: Greek NIKE Bn |
| 79th United States Air Defense Detachment | Erithea (Greece) | Supported unit: Greek NIKE Bn |
| 559th United States Army Artillery Group | | |
| HHD, 559th United States Army Artillery Group | Caserma Ederle, Vicenza (Italy) | Activated 10 January 1964 in Italy. 1964 control by SETAF. Supported unit: (IT) Field Artillery and Air Defense. Inactivated 15 August 1992 in Germany |
| 69th Ordnance Company | Site Pluto, Longare (Italy) | The 559th USAAG operated a central storage site at Longare (Site Pluto). SW for U.S. use: 24 ADMs and 155 mm artillery shells. SW for Italian use: 60 NIKE, 42 LANCE, 29 8-inch artillery warheads. |
| 11th United States Army Field Artillery Detachment (Whd Spt) (HJ) | Caserma Giovanni Ruazzi Elvas, Sciaves / Schabs (Italy) | Supported unit: (IT) 8-inch howitzers, 1967 - 1988 |
| 12th United States Army Field Artillery Detachment (Whd Spt) (HJ) | Caserma Zanusso, Oderzo (Italy) | Supported unit: 3rd (IT) Arty Regt, Oderzo (LANCE), with 2 teams in Oderzo, Codogné |
| 28th United States Army Field Artillery Detachment (Whd Spt) (HJ) | Caserma Capitò, Portogruaro (Italy) | Supported unit: (IT) LANCE |
| 31st United States Air Defense Detachment | Conselve (Italy) | Supported unit: Italian NIKE Bn (17e Reparto, Padova), 1963 - 1977, with 4 teams in Conselve, Chioggia, Bovolone, Zelo |
| 34th United States Air Defense Detachment | Ceggia (Italy) | Supported unit: Italian NIKE Bn (16e Reparto, Treviso), 1963 - 1977, 4 teams in Ceggia, Ca'Tron, Cordovado, Monte Pizzoc |
| 47th United States Air Defense Detachment | Monte Calvarina (Italy) | Supported unit: Italian NIKE Bn (7e Reparto, Vicenza), 1963 - 1977, 4 teams in Monte Grappa, Montichiari, Monte Toraro, Monte Calvarina |
| 34th United States Air Defense Detachment (new) | Ceggia (Italy) | CSupported unit: Italian NIKE Bn (16e Reparto, Treviso), 1977 - 1988, 4 teams in Ceggia (ex team 4/34th USAAD), Bagnoli (ex team 1/31st USAAD), Chioggia (ex team 2/31st USAAD), Cordovado (ex team 2/34th USAAD) |
| 47th United States Air Defense Detachment (new) | Padova (Italy) | Supported unit: Italian NIKE Bn (17e Reparto, Padova), 1977 - 1988, 3 teams in Monte Calvarina (ex team 4/47th USAAD), Bovolone (ex team 3/31st USAAD), Zelo (ex team 4/31st USAAD) |
| 40th United States Air Defense Detachment | Chioggia (Italy) | Supported unit: Italian NIKE Bn |
| 44th United States Air Defense Detachment | Zelo (Italy) | Supported unit: Italian NIKE Bn |
| 87th United States Air Defense Detachment | Ca'Tron (Italy) | Supported unit: for Italian NIKE Bn |
| 40th United States Air Defense Detachment | Chioggia (Italy) | Supported unit: Italian NIKE Bn |
| 576th United States Army Artillery Group | Gerszewski Barracks, Karlsruhe-Knielingen | Activated 24 September 1962 at Fort Sill, Oklahoma. Supported unit: 2 (FR) Corps, 1960 - 1966. Inactivated 15 September 1966 in Germany. |
| 6th United States Army Field Artillery Detachment (Msl Wh Spt) | Trier AB (Germany) | Supported unit: 68th (FR) Arty Regt, Trier (Honest John, 1960 - 1966 |
| 9th United States Army Field Artillery Detachment (Msl Wh Spt) | Quartier Vauban, Radolfzell (Germany) | Supported unit: 302nd (FR) Arty Group, Radolfzell (Honest John), 1960 - 1966 |
| 15th United States Army Field Artillery Detachment (Msl Wh Spt) | Quartier Lyautey, Villingen (Germany) | Supported unit: 50th (FR) Arty Regt, Villingen (Honest John), 1960 - 1966. Reactivated in Paderborn (570th USAAG). |
| 16th United States Army Field Artillery Detachment (Msl Wh Spt) | Quartier Maréchal Ney, Saarlouis (Germany) | Supported unit: 302rd (FR) Arty Group, Saarlouis (Honest John). 1960 - 1966 |
| 357th United States Air Defense Detachment | Böttingen, provisional Quartier de Reboul, Stetten am kalten Markt (Germany) | Supported unit: French NIKE Bn (Brigade d'Engins Nucléaires 520, Stetten am kalten Markt) |
| u/i United States Air Defense Detachment | Hettingen-Inneringen, provisional Quartier Durand de Villars, Friedrichshafen (Germany) | Supported unit: French NIKE Bn (Brigade d'Engins Nucléaires 521, Friedrichshafen) |

== Units ==
=== 41st Ordnance Company ===
The 41st Ordnance Company was organized in May 1936 as Company C, 1st Battalion, 32nd Quartermaster Regiment. It was redesignated as Company C, 70th Quartermaster Battalion in June 1940 and moved to Camp Gordon, Georgia, in May 1942. The company was converted and redesignated as the 3419th Ordnance Medium Maintenance Company in August 1942. The company was reorganized as the 3419th Ordnance Medium Automotive Maintenance Company in January 1943 and deployed to Europe participating in four campaigns during World War II. It was reorganized and redesignated as the 41st Ordnance Medium Automotive Maintenance Company in June 1947 and inactivated in Germany in September 1947.

The company was activated in Japan in March 1950 and deployed to Korea where it participated in one campaign. The unit was inactivated in Japan in November 1951.

The company was activated at Fort Bragg, North Carolina, in May 1952 and was redesignated as the 41st Ordnance Company in November 1952. The 41st was inactivated in Thailand in September 1966.

The 41st Ordnance Company was reactivated in September 1975 and garrisoned at Rhine Ordnance Barracks in Vogelweh, part of the Kaiserslautern military community and was assigned to the 72nd Ordnance Battalion, 59th Ordnance Brigade. The 41st provided general support on various missile systems. Their Dedicated Delivery Service program provided a direct exchange of defective missile parts. The 41st maintained two storage depots: in Weilerbach and in Fischbach where large reserves of Pershing, Hawk and Nike Hercules missile systems were stored and maintained

The company was reassigned to the reactivated 3rd Ordnance Battalion, 59th Ordnance Brigade in September 1977. The 3rd Ordnance Battalion was transferred to the 32nd Army Air Defense Command and the 41st Ordnance was transferred to Special Troops Battalion on 1 November 1982 then to the Theater Support Battalion. The 3rd Ordnance Battalion transferred back to the 59th Ordnance Brigade in June 1985 and regained the 41st Ordnance Company. The 3rd Ordnance Battalion was inactivated in October 1990 and the 41st was transferred to the 197th Ordnance Battalion.

=== 82nd United States Army Missile Detachment ===
The 82nd United States Army Missile Detachment was activated in 1965 under the 512th United States Army Artillery Group, 59th Ordnance Brigade and was garrisoned at Lechfeld Air Base, West Germany. The detachment controlled the Pershing missile warheads of Missile Wing 1, German Air Force. The detachment merged with 74th United States Army Missile Detachment in 1971 to form the 74th United States Army Field Artillery Detachment.

=== 85th United States Army Field Artillery Detachment ===
The 85th United States Army Field Artillery Detachment (85th USAFAD) was activated in November 1966 at Fort Sill, Oklahoma and assigned to the 2nd Missile Battalion, 79th Artillery. The unit was reassigned to the 2nd Missile Battalion, 44th Artillery in November 1968. The unit then moved to Fliegerhorst Kaserne in NATO Air Base Geilenkirchen, West Germany in August 1969 and was assigned to the 5th United States Army Artillery Group in November. The detachment controlled the Pershing missile warheads of Missile Wing 2, German Air Force. The unit was reassigned to the 557th United States Army Artillery Group, 59th Ordnance Brigade in October 1979. The detachment was deactivated on 15 February 1991.

=== 74th United States Army Field Artillery Detachment ===
The 74th United States Army Missile Detachment was formed in April 1965 under the 512th United States Army Artillery Group, 59th Ordnance Brigade and was garrisoned at Schwabstadl Kaserne in Schwabstadl, West Germany. The detachment controlled the Pershing missile warheads of Missile Wing 1, German Air Force. The detachment merged with the 82nd United States Army Missile Detachment to form the 74th United States Army Field Artillery Detachment (74th USAFAD) in 1971.

=== 579th Ordnance Company ===
The 579th Ordnance Company was activated and assigned to the 81st Ordnance Battalion on 24 June 1961 in Wiesbaden, commanded by Captain William H. Dodd. The Seventh United States Army Advance Weapons Guided Missile Company, located in Gonsenheim and the 367th Ordnance Detachment were deactivated on the same date and most of the personnel were transferred to the 579th; the 167th Ordnance Detachment was attached to the 579th. The mission of the 579th was to provide general support maintenance for all non-explosive components of "Y" missiles and all ordnance material of the ground guidance launching and handling equipment not allied with automotive or conventional mechanical equipment. In 1964 the 579th was transferred to the 19th Ordnance Battalion.

The 579th Ordnance Company under the 59th Ordnance Group was assigned the general support role for the Pershing in 1966. The company was garrisoned on Kleber Kaserne in Kaiserslautern. In January 1967, the company moved to Wartberg Kaserne in Pforzheim. The 579th then moved to Nelson Barracks in Neu-Ulm in a general support maintenance role. In 1977 the 3rd Ordnance Battalion was activated under the 59th Ordnance Brigade with the 579th as a subordinate unit. In 1982, the 579th was deactivated and reformed as Headquarters and Headquarters Company and D Company of the 55th Maintenance Battalion, 56th Field Artillery Brigade.

Members of the 579th wore the shoulder sleeve insignia of the Theater Army Support Command (TASCOM) until 1974, then the United States Army Europe (USAREUR). They wore the distinctive unit insignia of the 59th Ordnance Brigade until 1977 when the unit switched to that of the 3rd Ordnance Battalion.

Commanders

- Major Stanley Olsen
- Captain Gene Dziedzic Jr
- Major Francis W. Thonus
- Major Richard A. Carter
- Captain Michael C. Kilgore
