= United States Army Ordnance Munitions and Electronic Maintenance School =

The United States Army Ordnance Munitions and Electronic Maintenance School (OMEMS) was a school of the United States Army from 1952 until it merged into the United States Army Ordnance School in 2011. Its mission was to train military and civilians to safely disarm and dismantle explosives and repair and maintain electronics, missile and ammunition systems.

== History ==
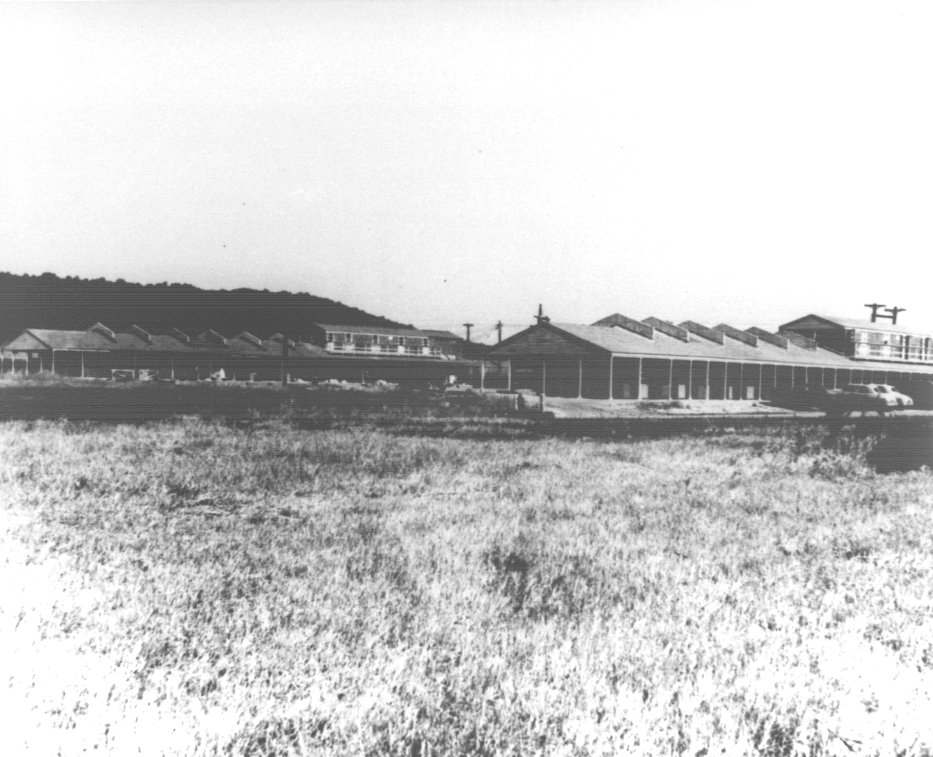
Provisional Redstone Ordnance School (1952)

In March 1952, the Provisional Redstone Ordnance School was established at Redstone Arsenal, Alabama. In December 1952, the Ordnance Guided Missile School (OGMS) was established, taking over the provisional operation. The OGMS greatly expanded through the years, occupying a large land area with many buildings and providing a wide variety of missile and munitions courses for thousands of students from the U.S. as well as many foreign countries. The name was later changed to the Missile and Munitions Center and School (MMCS) in 1966 and then to the Ordnance Missile and Munitions Center and School (OMMCS) in 1988. OMMCS consisted of:

- Electronics Technology Department with a Patriot detachment at Fort Bliss and an Ordnance Training Detachment at Fort Sill
- EOD Training Department with an EOD detachment at Eglin Air Force Base
- Missile Systems Training Department
- Munitions Training Department
- Ordnance Electronics Maintenance Training detachment at Fort Gordon
- NCO Academy

The school trained members of the United States Army, United States Marine Corps, the Federal Bureau of Investigation and other law enforcement agencies. The military of allied countries included West Germany, the United Kingdom, Italy, Saudi Arabia, United Arab Emirates (UAE), Jordan, Greece, Spain and Turkey.

The School Brigade administratively operated MMCS with subordinate companies for staff, faculty and students. In 1994, the School Brigade disbanded and was replaced by the reformed 59th Ordnance Brigade. As the U.S. Army retired their major missile systems, OMMCS dropped the related training and was renamed to the Ordnance Munitions and Electronic Maintenance School (OMEMS) in 2002. As part of the Base Realignment and Closure (BRAC) process the U.S. Army Ordnance Center and School was moved from Aberdeen Proving Ground, Maryland to Fort Lee, Virginia in 2009. Under BRAC, OMEMS moved to Fort Lee in 2011 and was merged into the Ordnance School under the 59th Ordnance Brigade.

== Missile and munitions systems ==
The school provided training on a myriad of systems, including:

- M270 Multiple Launch Rocket System
- Pershing 1 Field Artillery Missile System
- Pershing 1a Field Artillery Missile System
- Pershing II Weapon System
- MGM-52 Lance
- MIM-3 Nike Ajax
- MIM-14 Nike Hercules
- M247 Sergeant York
- Roland
- MIM-23 Hawk
- MIM-72 Chaparral
- M163 VADS
- M167 VADS
- FIM-43 Redeye
- FIM-92 Stinger
- PGM-11 Redstone
- MGM-29 Sergeant
- MGM-5 Corporal
- MGR-1 Honest John
- MGR-3 Little John

== Heraldry ==
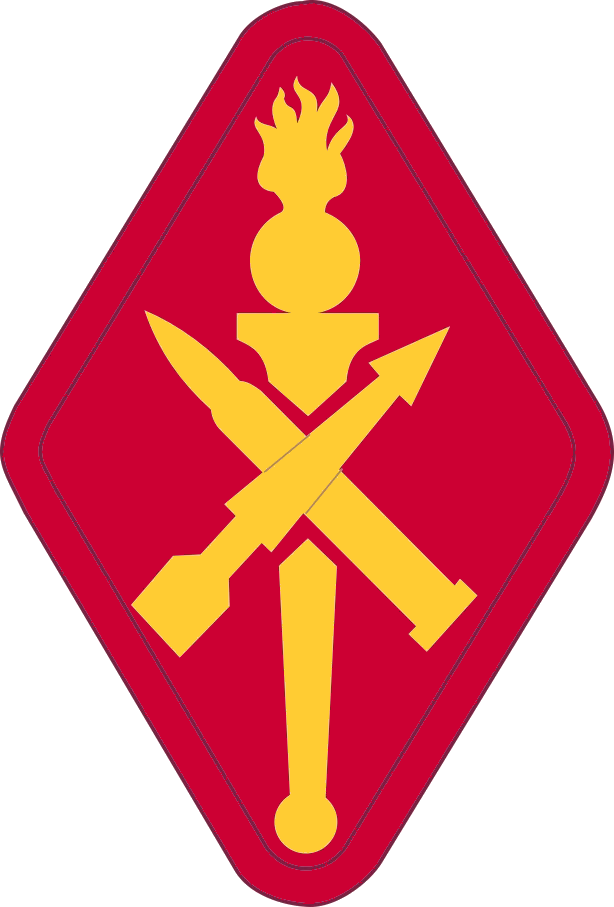
Shoulder sleeve insignia

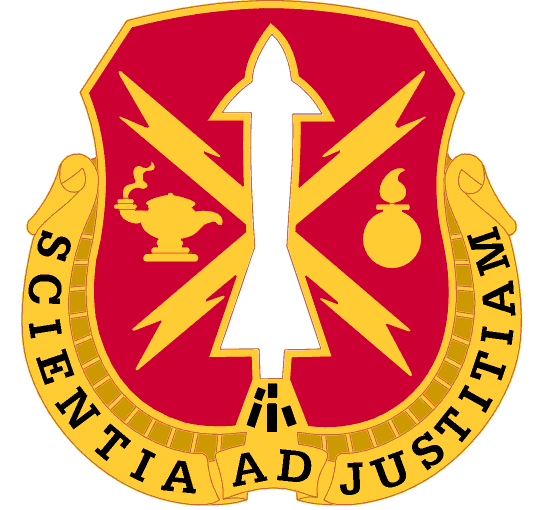
Distinctive unit insignia

The Ordnance Missile and Munitions Center and School had its own insignia from 1966 to 1994 when it changed to the insignia of the 59th Ordnance Brigade.

=== Shoulder sleeve insignia ===
- Blazon: On a crimson lozenge with rounded corners 3 inches (7.6 cm) in height and 2 inches (5.1 cm) in width overall a yellow torch of knowledge surmounted by a yellow missile and a yellow cartridge saltirewise, the missile crossing over the cartridge and the torch separated from the missile and cartridge by crimson fimbriations all within a 1/8 inch (0.32 cm) crimson border.
- Symbolism: Crimson and yellow are the colors used for Ordnance. The torch signifies knowledge and alludes to training in missiles and munitions.
- Background: The shoulder sleeve insignia was approved on 7 November 1969. The insignia was amended on 2 May 2002, to extend wear to the U.S. Army Ordnance Center and School. (TIOH Dwg. No. A-1-528)

=== Distinctive unit insignia ===
- Shield: Crimson, surmounting two lightning flashes salterwise between in fess a lamp of knowledge and a flaming bomb Or, a guided missile with trail from base in pale Proper (white missile).
- Motto: Scientia Ad Justitiam (Knowledge For Righteousness).
- Symbolism: Crimson and yellow are the colors for Ordnance. The missile depicts the mission of the Center and the School to train officers and enlisted men in the supply and maintenance of guided missiles. The lamp, symbolic of understanding and knowledge, further indicates the scholastic activity of the school. The lightning flashes represent electronic impulses and denote guidance of men as well as missiles. The bomb alludes to the Ordnance Corps.
- Background: The distinctive unit insignia was originally approved for the U.S. Army Ordnance Guided Missile School on 27 September 1954. It was redesignated for the U.S. Army Missile and Munitions Center and School on 18 February 1966.
