= Kaufbeuren Air Base =

Military airfield in Kaufbeuren, Germany

Kaufbeuren Air Base Fliegerhorst Kaufbeuren

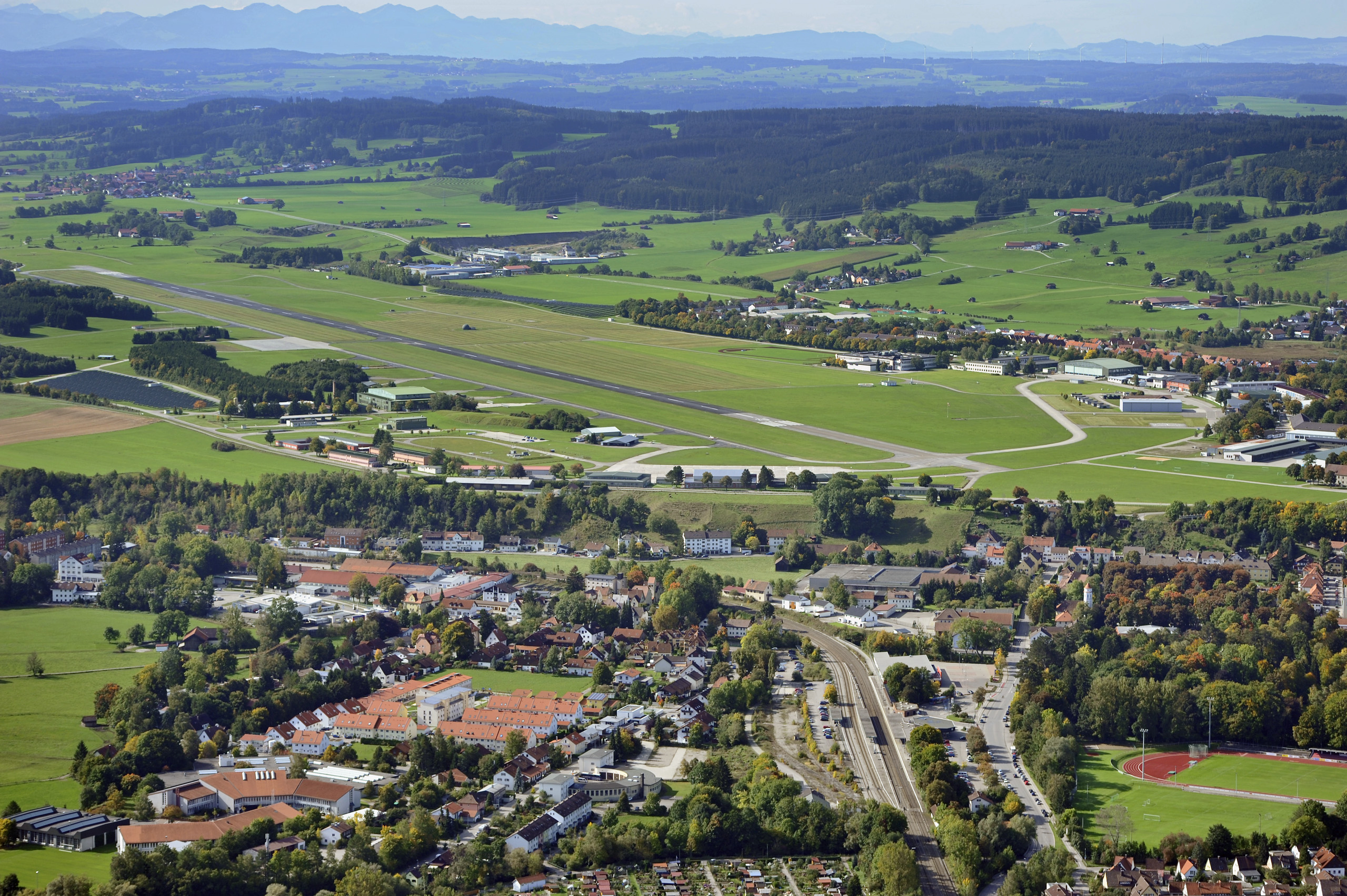
- IATA: none; ICAO: ETSK

Summary
- Airport type: Military
- Owner: Unified Armed Forces of the Federal Republic of Germany
- Operator: German Air Force
- Location: Kaufbeuren, Germany
- Coordinates: 47°51′44″N 010°36′53″E

Map
- Location of Kaufbeuren Air Base

Runways
Direction	Length		Surface
Direction	ft	m	Surface
			Asphalt

Kaufbeuren Air Base (Fliegerhorst Kaufbeuren) is a German Air Force military airbase. It is currently the home of the Luftwaffe Technical School 1.

== History ==
Originally built in 1935 as a Luftwaffe station, the aerodrome was seized by the United States Army in May 1945 at the end of World War II. The 289th Combat Engineers were ordered in to occupy the site as military police when it was discovered to be the final location of Nazi Party's top secret FA signals intelligence and cryptanalytic agency. After all intelligence aspects perceived crucial by TICOM, the U.S. intelligence and technology gathering organization, were secured, it was occupied by the 225th Anti-Aircraft Searchlight Battalion. The USAAF 55th Fighter Group based P-51 Mustangs at the airfield from 22 July 1945 - 28 April 1946.

Renamed Kaufbeuren AFB (later, Kaufbeuren AB), the 60th Troop Carrier Wing was assigned to the base from 1 July 1948 until 1 October 1949. Shortly after moving to Kaufbeuren the 60 TCW and its three squadrons—the 10th, 11th, and 12th Troop Carriers Squadrons—began supporting the Berlin Airlift. From 26 June 1948 to 30 September 1949, the C-47 Skytrain and C-54 Skymaster equipped squadrons flew from both Kaufbeuren and Wiesbaden AB, Germany, and contributed to the U.S. total of nearly 1.8 million tons of supplies delivered on 189,963 flights.

On 20 January 1949, the wing's headquarters element moved to RAF Fassberg, Germany, and fell under operational control of the 1st Airlift Task Force. When the Berlin Airlift ended on 26 September 1949, the 60 TCW began moving without its personnel and equipment to Wiesbaden, where it assumed the resources of the inactivated 7150th Air Force Composite Wing. The 60th became operational at Wiesbaden on 1 October 1949.

The shift of USAF bases to locations west of the Rhine River meant that permanent active flying organizations were not assigned to Kaufbeuren, and it was used as a communications station under the 7320th Air Force Wing. In 1955, the 7330th Flying Training Wing was established on the base to train German pilots for the reconstituted German Air Force. The facility was handed back to the West German government on 16 December 1957.

Missile Group 11 (German: Flugkörpergruppen 11, FKGrp 11) was activated in Kaufbeuren Air Base in February 1958, equipped with the MGM-1 Matador cruise missile.

Used as an active Luftwaffe airbase until the 1990s, it is now a non-flying training facility.

In June 2026, Bavaria's Minister President Söder confirmed that the radar for the Arrow missile defense system will be installed near the Bundeswehr compound.
