= Missile Wing 2 =

- German: Flugkörpergeschwader 2
- Active: 1965–1991
- Disbanded: 1991
- Country: West Germany
- Branch: German Air Force
- Part of: 3rd Luftwaffendivision, Second Allied Tactical Air Force

Missile Wing 2 (German: Flugkörpergeschwader 2, FKG 2) was a unit of the German Air Force. It was activated on 1 January 1965 in Lechfeld with two subordinate units: Missile Group 21 (German: Flugkörpergruppe 21) and Missile Group 22 (German: Flugkörpergruppe 22).

Missile Group 21 moved to Nörvenich in September 1965. In 1976, the Quick Reaction Alert (QRA) site at Arsbeck became operational for FKG 2, and QRA Nörvenich was used for training. In November 1986, QRA Arsbeck was closed.

Warheads were under U.S. control, released only in wartime conditions. Warheads were controlled by the 85th U.S. Army Field Artillery Detachment (85th USAFAD) from 1969 to 1991.

Pershing 1b was a single stage, reduced range version of the Pershing II with the same range as the Pershing 1a. The Pershing II launcher was designed so that the cradle could be easily repositioned to handle the shorter missile airframe. The intent was to replace the German Air Force's Pershing 1a systems with Pershing 1b, since SALT II limited the range of German-owned missiles. The German government agreed to destroy its Pershing 1a systems when the U.S. and the U.S.S.R. signed the Intermediate-Range Nuclear Forces Treaty on 27 May 1988, thus the Pershing 1b was never deployed. Although not covered by the treaty, West Germany agreed unilaterally to the removal of the Pershing 1a missiles from its inventory in 1991, and the missiles were destroyed in the United States.

The wing was deactivated on 31 December 1991.

== Commanders ==
- Oberst Hans-Wilhelm Fleckner 1965-1969
- Oberstleutnant Heinz Eschershaus 1969-1971
- Oberst Egon Winkler 1971-1976
- Oberst Heinrich Basse 1976-1982
- Oberst Heinz Kohler 1982-1985
- Oberst Manfred Günter 1985-1990

== Gallery ==
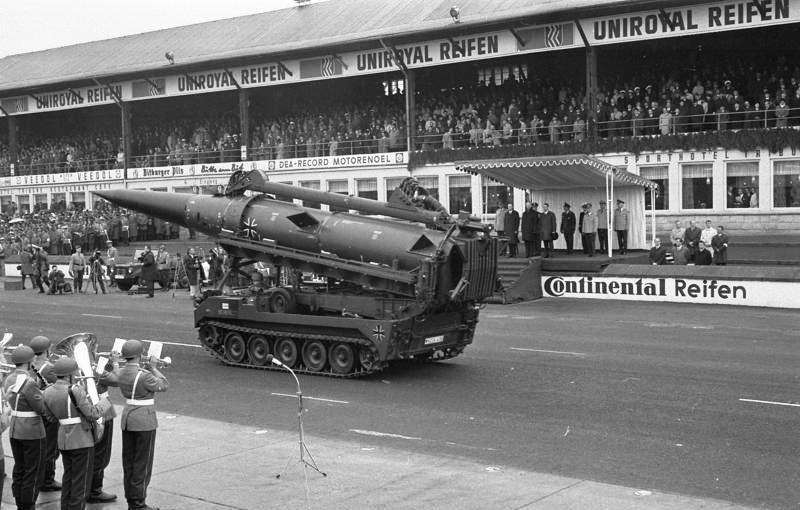
West German Air Force Pershing 1 on parade, 6 June 1969

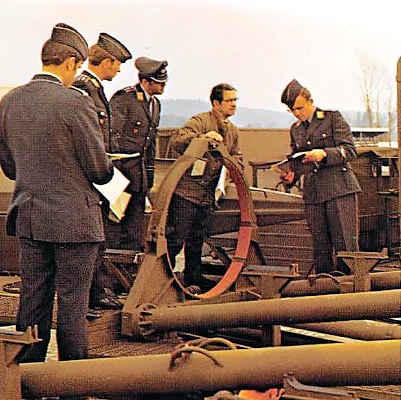
Members of the West German Air Force receive Pershing 1a equipment in early 1971

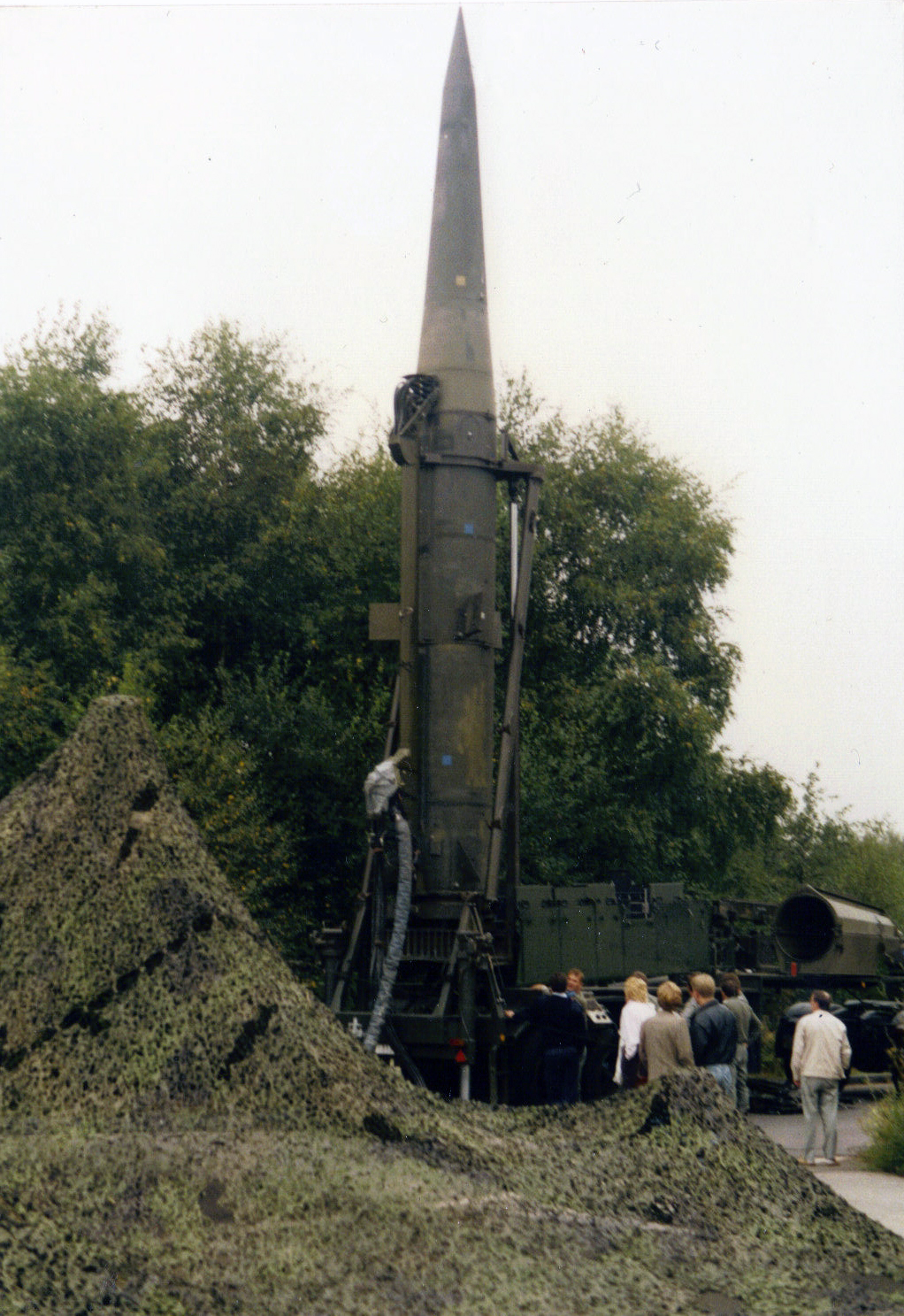
Pershing 1a on display with FKG 2, August 1989

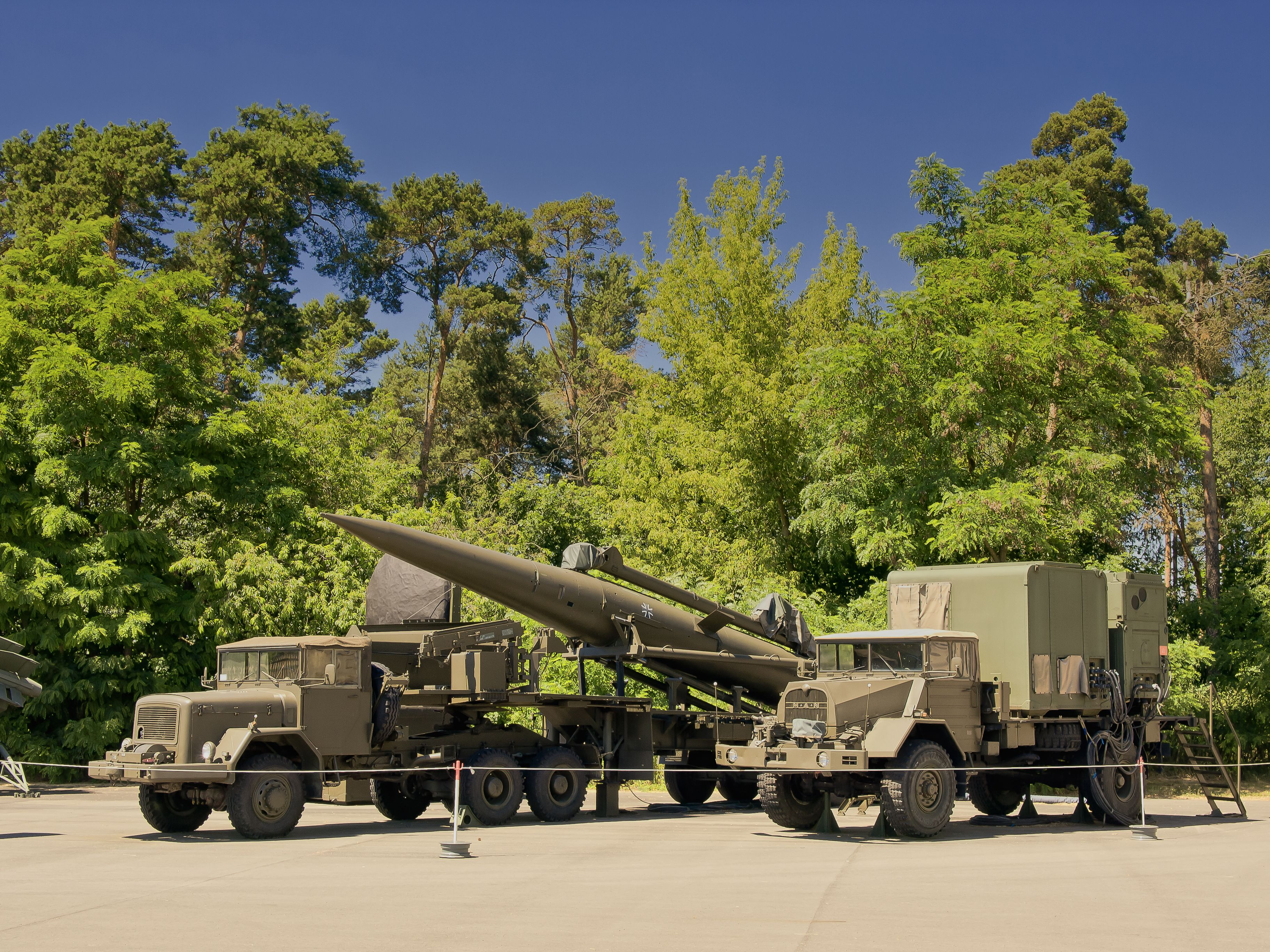
West German Air Force Pershing 1a at the Militärhistorisches Museum Flugplatz Berlin-Gatow, Germany
