= Monte Toraro =

Mountain in Italy

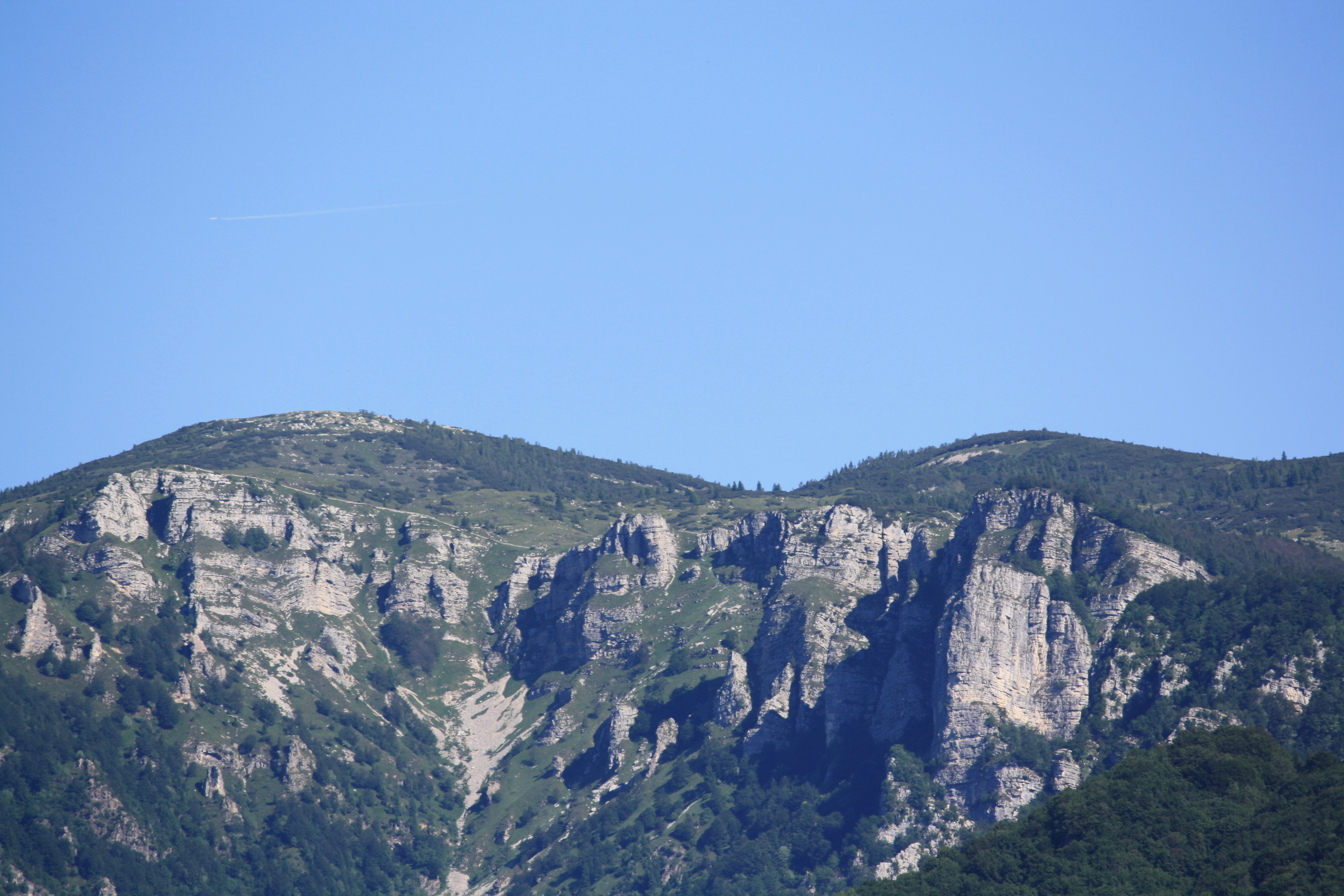

Highest point
- Elevation: 1,897 m (6,224 ft)
- Coordinates: 45°51′45″N 11°16′08″E

Geography
- Location: Veneto, Italy
- Parent range: Vicentine Alps

Monte Toraro is a mountain of Veneto, Italy. It is located on the Asiago Plateau, in the Vicentine Alps, and has an elevation of 1,897 metres (6,224 ft).

During the First World War Toraro was the location of an Italian howitzer battery, and was captured by Austro-Hungarian troops during the battle of Asiago.

During the Cold War, radars and command posts for a nearby Nike missile base (Base Tuono) were built on its top. They were blown up after the base ceased operations in the late 1970s.
