= List of Cape Canaveral and Merritt Island launch sites =

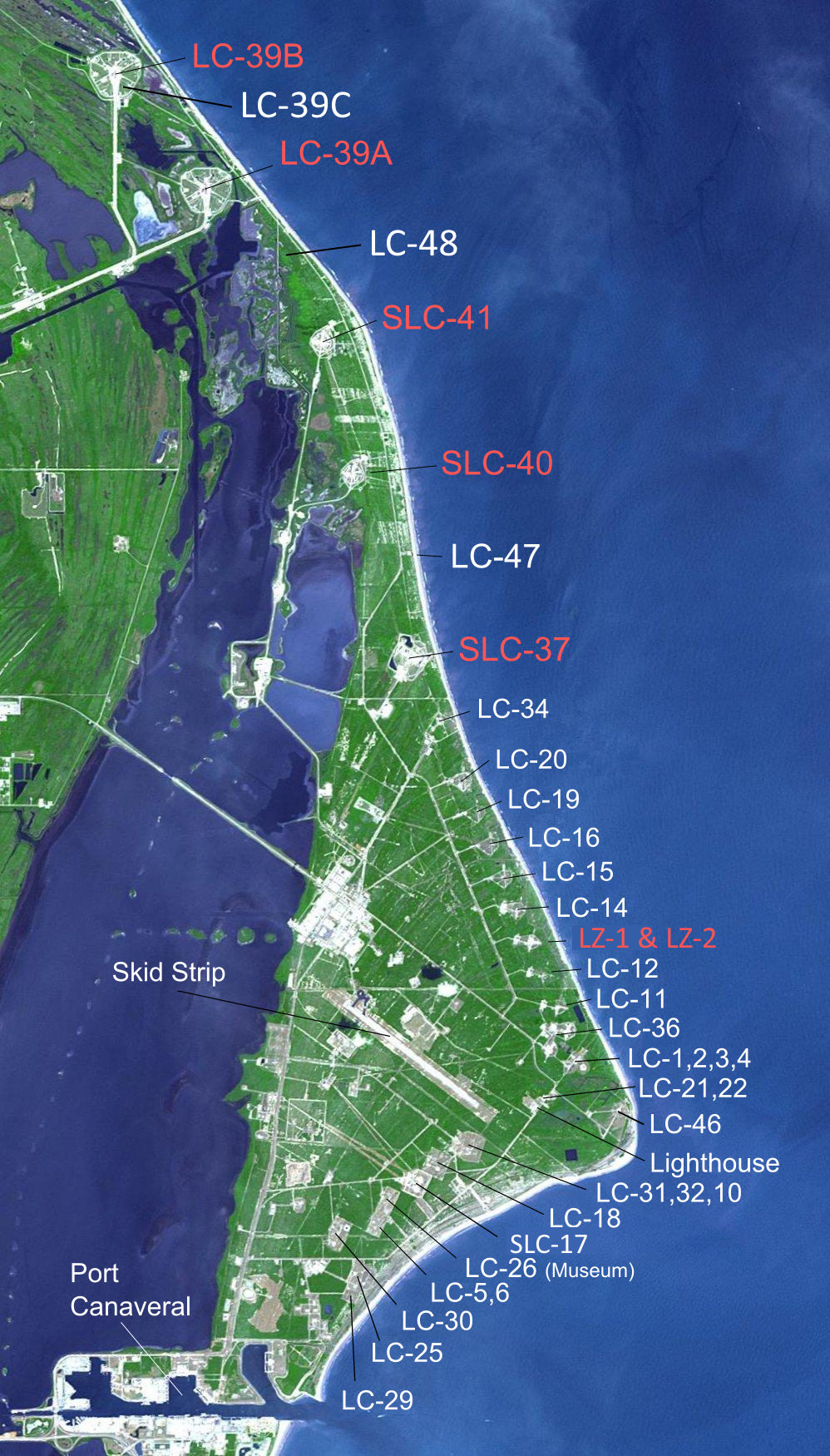
Map of launch complexes on Merritt Island and Cape Canaveral

Launch sites at Cape Canaveral Space Force Station and Kennedy Space Center
Active pads
Inactive leased pads
Inactive unleased pads
Repurposed pads, not used for launches
1 LC-39B
2 LC-39A
3 LC-48
4 SLC-41
5 SLC-40
6 LC-47
7 SLC-37
8 LC-34
9 SLC-20
10 LC-19
11 LC-16
12 LC-15
13 LC-14
14 LC-13 (LZ-2)
15 LC-12
16 LC-11
17 LC-36
18 LC-1, LC-2, LC-3, and LC-4
19 SLC-46
20 LC-21 and LC-22
21 LC-31 and LC-32
22 LC-18
23 SLC-17
24 LC-26
25 LC-5 and LC-6
26 LC-30
27 LC-25
28 LC-29

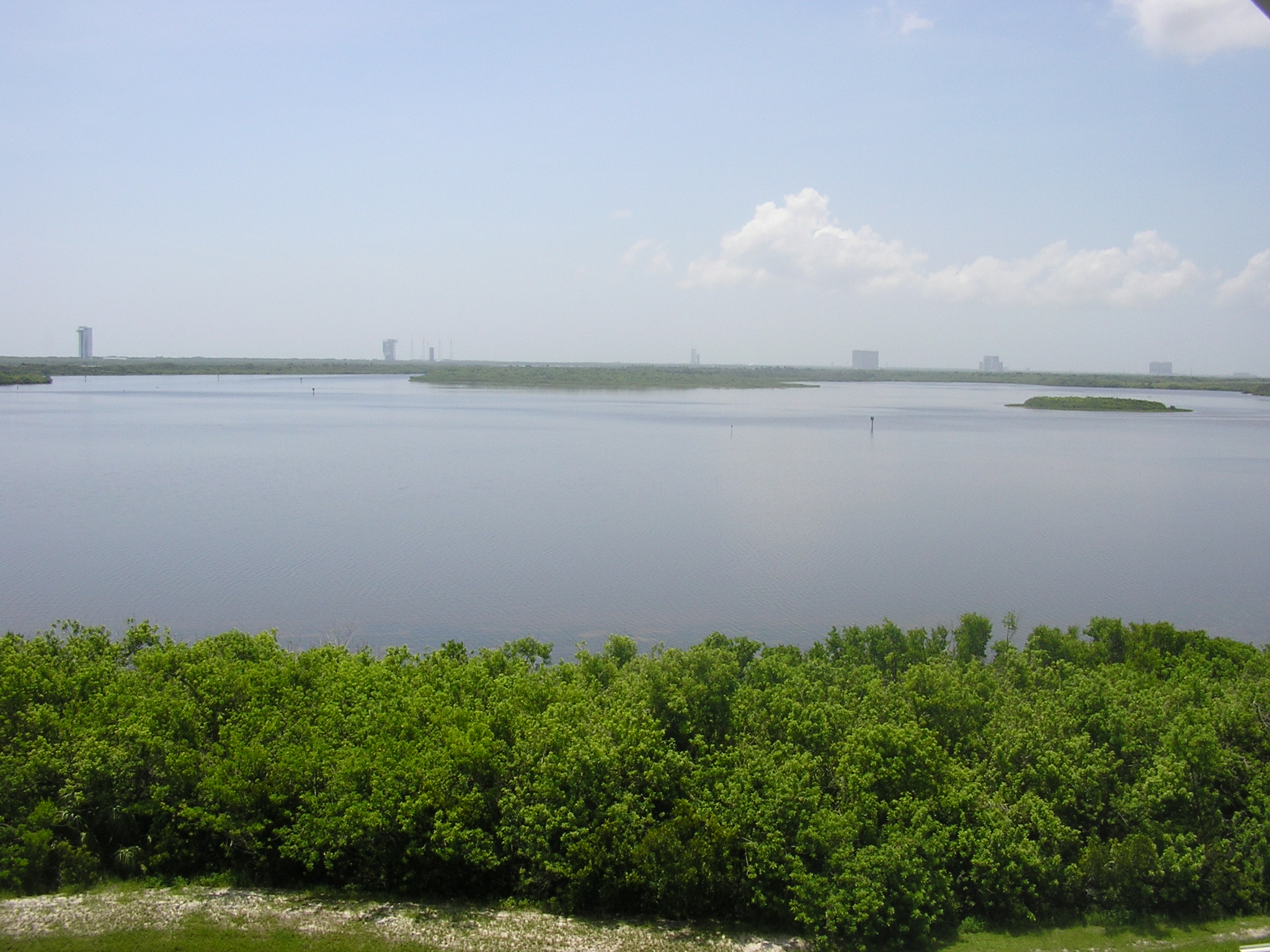
Looking east, left-right: LC-41, LC-40, (center) LC-37B, Harrison Island, Vertical Integration Facility, and the ITL Warehouse on CCAFS in 2005

Cape Canaveral and adjacent Merritt Island on Florida's Atlantic coast are home to the USA's Eastern Range, the most active rocket range and spaceport in the country. The Eastern Range hosts two groundside operators: the military Cape Canaveral Space Force Station and the civilian Kennedy Space Center. Between them are dozens of launch pads, with several currently in active service and more in planning for activation.

== List ==
=== Key ===
Denotes sites actively being used for launches
Denotes sites actively used for non-launch activities, such as landing
Denotes inactive sites planned with future use in mind
Denotes unused inactive sites
Denotes demolished, unbuilt, or never used sites

=== Kennedy Space Center ===
Kennedy Space Center, operated by NASA, has two launch complexes on Merritt Island comprising three pads—two active (with one under lease) and one inactive. From 1967 to 1975, it was the site of 13 Saturn V launches, three crewed Skylab flights and the Apollo–Soyuz; all Space Shuttle flights from 1981 to 2011, and one Ares 1-X flight in 2009. Since 2017, SpaceX uses Launch Complex 39A to launch their launch vehicles.

Site	Status	Tenant	Uses	Notable launches	Coordinates
Launch Complex 39A	Active	SpaceX	Current: Falcon 9, Falcon Heavy; Future: Starship; Retired: Saturn V, Space Shuttle; Cancelled: Ares V The launch site of all six crewed lunar landing missions of the Apollo Program.	Apollo 4, Apollo 8, Apollo 11, Apollo 13, Apollo 17, Skylab, STS-1, STS-7, STS-71, STS-88, STS-107, STS-135, Falcon Heavy test flight, Crew Dragon Demo-2, Inspiration4, Psyche, Europa Clipper, Nancy Grace Roman Space Telescope	28°36′30.2″N 80°36′15.6″W
Launch Complex 39B	Active	NASA (Note: Also the owner of the pad.)	Current: Space Launch System; Retired: Saturn V, Saturn IB, Space Shuttle, Ares I-X; Cancelled: Ares I, OmegA; The launch site of the Challenger disaster.	Apollo 10, Skylab 2, Skylab 3, Skylab 4, Apollo-Soyuz, STS-51L, STS-34, STS-31, STS-93, Artemis I, Artemis II	28°37′38″N 80°37′15″W
Launch Complex 39C	Unbuilt		Located within LC-39B. It was intended to be used for small-lift launch vehicles and as a general multipurpose launch site. Abandoned in 2016 in favor of building LC-48.		28°37′32.462″N 80°37′5.12″W
Launch Complex 48	Inactive		LC-48 is designed as a "clean pad" (a reconfigurable facility with no permanent structures) to support various small-lift launch vehicles. It is awaiting its first customer.		28°35′55″N 80°35′20.8″W
Launch Complex 49	Unbuilt		Cancelled: Starship; Plans were suspended in 2024.		28°38′28″N 80°38′47″W

=== Cape Canaveral Space Force Station ===
Cape Canaveral Space Force Station (CCSFS), operated by Space Launch Delta 45 of the U.S. Space Force, was the site of all U.S. crewed launches before Apollo 8, as well as many other early Department of Defense (DoD) and NASA launches. For the DoD, it plays a secondary role to Vandenberg SFB in California, but is the launch site for many NASA uncrewed space probes, as those spacecraft are typically launched on United States Space Force launchers. Much of the support activity for CCSFS occurs at Patrick Space Force Base to the south, its reporting base.

==== Active sites ====
Site	Tenant	Uses	Notable launches	Coordinates
Space Launch Complex 40	SpaceX	Current: Falcon 9 Retired: Titan IIIC, Titan 34D, Commercial Titan III, Titan IV	OPS 0855, ATS-6, Mars Observer, Cassini-Huygens, Dragon C2+, DSCOVR, TESS, Beresheet, Euclid, Hera, SpaceX Crew-9	28.562106°N 80.577180°W
Space Launch Complex 41	United Launch Alliance	Current: Vulcan Centaur, Atlas V Retired: Titan IIIC, Titan IIIE, Titan IV	OPS 6911, Helios 1 & 2, Voyager 1 & 2, Viking 1 & 2, New Horizons, Lunar Reconnaissance Orbiter, Juno, Mars Science Laboratory, Mars 2020, Lucy, Peregrine Mission One, Boeing Crew Flight Test	28°35′00″N 80°34′59″W
Space Launch Complex 46	Space Florida (Note: Acts as a middleman tenant. Subtenants include Astra Space.)	Current: Dark Eagle; Future: Rocket 4/5; Retired: Trident II, Athena II, Athena I, Minotaur IV, Orion Abort Test Booster, Rocket 3 SLC-46 is a clean pad.	Lunar Prospector, Ascent Abort-2	28°27′30″N 80°31′42″W

==== Repurposed sites ====
Site	Tenant	Uses	Notable launches	Coordinates
Launch Complex 5	Cape Canaveral Space Force Museum	Retired: Jupiter-C, Redstone, Mercury-Redstone. The site of all six crewed and uncrewed Mercury-Redstone launches used for Project Mercury. Now part of the Cape Canaveral Space Force Museum.	Pioneer 4, Mercury-Redstone 1, Mercury-Redstone 3, Mercury-Redstone 4	28°26′22″N 80°34′24″W
Launch Complex 6	Cape Canaveral Space Force Museum	Retired: Redstone, Jupiter; Now part of the Cape Canaveral Space Force Museum.		28°26′27″N 80°34′22″W
Launch Complex 11	Blue Origin	Retired: Atlas; Part of larger site which includes LC-36. Currently used to test New Glenn equipment.	SCORE	28°28′32″N 80°32′26″W
Launch Complex 12	Blue Origin	Retired: Atlas, Atlas-Able, Atlas-Agena; Currently used as a storage stie for New Glenn infrastructure.	Mariner 2, Ranger 7, Mariner 4, Mariner 5	28°28′49″N 80°32′31″W
Launch Complex 13	Phantom Space and Vaya Space (de jure); SpaceX (de facto)	Current: Falcon 9 landings, Falcon Heavy landings Future: Daytona I, Dauntless; Retired: Atlas, Atlas Agena; The location of Landing Zones 1 and 2.	Mariner 3, Lunar Orbiter 1, Orbcomm OG2 M2 (landing), Falcon Heavy test flight (landing)	28.4859°N 80.5444°W
Launch Complex 18	Blue Origin	Retired: Viking, Vanguard, Thor, Blue Scout Junior, Blue Scout; Currently used as the site for New Glenn's payload processing facility.	Vanguard TV-3, Vanguard 1, Vanguard 2, Vanguard 3, Mercury-Scout 1	28.4493°N 80.5623°W
Launch Complex 25	United States Navy	Retired: Polaris, Poseidon, Trident I Part of the Naval Ordnance Test Unit. Currently used to house the Trident II Engineering Test Facility.		28.431988°N 80.576943°W
Launch Complex 26	Cape Canaveral Space Force Museum	Retired: Jupiter, Redstone; Launch site of Explorer 1 - the first successful U.S. satellite. Now part of the Cape Canaveral Space Force Museum.	Explorer 1	28°26′39″N 80°34′17″W
Launch Complex 29	United States Navy	Retired: Polaris; Part of the Naval Ordnance Test Unit. Currently used to house the Trident II Engineering Test Facility.		28°25′47″N 80°34′38″W

==== Sites leased for future use ====
Site	Tenant	Uses	Notable launches	Coordinates
Launch Complex 14	Stoke Space	Future: Nova; Retired: Atlas, Mercury-Atlas, Atlas-Agena; The site of all four crewed Mercury-Atlas launches used for Project Mercury.	Mercury-Atlas 5, Mercury-Atlas 6, Mercury-Atlas 9, Gemini 8 ATV, Gemini 11 ATV	28°29′28″N 80°32′49″W
Launch Complex 16	Relativity Space	Future: Terran R Retired: Titan I, Titan II, Pershing 1a, Pershing II, Terran 1		28.5017°N 80.5518°W
Space Launch Complex 20	Firefly Aerospace (Note: Subtenant; tenant is Space Florida. Eclipse will also be operated in conjunction with Northrop Grumman.)	Future: Alpha, Eclipse; Retired: Titan I, Titan IIIA, Starbird, Prospector, Aries, LCLV, Super Loki	LES-1, LCS-1	28°30′44″N 80°33′24″W
Launch Complex 36A	Blue Origin (Note: Subtenant; tenant is Space Florida.)	Suspended: New Glenn 7×2; Retired: Atlas-Centaur, Atlas II; Cancelled: Athena III; Pad was significantly damaged following an explosion on May 28, 2026.	Surveyor 1, Mariner 7, Pioneer 10, Pioneer Venus Orbiter, Pioneer Venus Multiprobe, ESCAPADE	28°28′14″N 80°32′24″W
Launch Complex 36B	Blue Origin	Future: New Glenn 9×4; Retired: Atlas-Centaur, Atlas G, Atlas I, Atlas II, Atlas III; Cancelled: Athena III	Surveyor 3, OAO-2, Mariner 6, Mariner 9, Pioneer 11, Mariner 10, SOHO	28°28′14″N 80°32′24″W
Space Launch Complex 37A	SpaceX	Future: Starship; Cancelled: Saturn I, Saturn IB; Pad has never been used.		28.531986°N 80.566821°W
Space Launch Complex 37B	SpaceX	Future: Starship; Retired: Saturn I, Saturn IB, Delta IV, Delta IV Heavy	SA-5, AS-101, AS-105, Apollo 5, Exploration Flight Test-1, Parker Solar Probe	28.531986°N 80.566821°W

==== Inactive, undeveloped, and previously used sites ====
Site	Status	Uses	Notable launches	Coordinates
Launch Complex A Launch Complex B Launch Complex C Launch Complex D	Demolished	Retired: Matador; LC-46 now sits on the site.		
Launch Complex 1	Inactive	Retired: Snark, Matador, Aerostat		28°27′54″N 80°32′15″W
Launch Complex 2	Inactive	Retired: Snark, Matador, Aerostat		28°27′56″N 80°32′13″W
Launch Complex 3	Inactive	Retired: Bumper-WAC, BOMARC, Polaris, X-17		28°27′57″N 80°32′13″W
Launch Complex 4	Inactive	Retired: BOMARC, Redstone, Matador, Jason, Draco		28.466667°N 80.535669°W
Launch Complex 4A	Inactive	Retired: BOMARC		
Launch Complex 7 Launch Complex 8	Unbuilt	Would have joined LC-1/2/3/4. No assigned missile assigned to pad, though likely would launch missiles like Snark and Matador. Located at present site of Central Control Road.		28.463061°N 80.540208°W
Launch Complex 9	Inactive	Retired: Navaho		28°27′07″N 80°33′35″W
Launch Complex 10	Demolished	Retired: Jason, Draco, Nike Tomahawk; Demolished to make way for LC-31 and LC-32.		28°27′07″N 80°33′25″W
Launch Complex 15	Inactive	Retired: Titan I, Titan II; Cancelled: RS1		28.4963°N 80.5493°W
Launch Complex 17A	Demolished	Retired: Thor, Thor-Able, Thor-Ablestar, Thor DSV-2, Delta I, Delta II	Pioneer 1, Explorer 6, OSO-1, Ariel 1, Mars Global Surveyor, Deep Space 1, Mars Climate Orbiter, Stardust, 2001 Mars Odyssey, Genesis, Mars Exploration Rover Spirit, Swift Observatory	28°26′48″N 80°33′58″W
Launch Complex 17B	Demolished	Retired: Thor, Thor-Ablestar, Thor DSV-2, Delta I, Delta II, Delta III	Courier 1B, Telstar 1, Syncom 2, NEAR Shoemaker, Mars Pathfinder, WMAP, Mars Exploration Rover Opportunity, Spitzer Space Telescope, MESSENGER, Deep Impact, Dawn, Kepler Space Telescope	28°26′48″N 80°33′58″W
Launch Complex 19	Inactive	Retired: Titan I, Titan II GLV. The site of all ten crewed Titan II launches used for Project Gemini.	Gemini 3, Gemini 4, Gemini 7, Gemini 6A, Gemini 8, Gemini 11, Gemini 12	28°30′24″N 80°33′15″W
Launch Complex 21	Inactive	Retired: Goose, Mace		28°27′38″N 80°32′24″W
Launch Complex 22	Inactive	Retired: Goose, Mace		28.4610°N 80.5398°W
Launch Complex 23; Launch Complex 24	Inactive	Retired: Triton, Snark; Intended to have two pads and a single blockhouse, but only one pad was built and the blockhouse was never built.		28.464551°N 80.537816°W
Launch Complex 27	Unbuilt	Cancelled: G-38 Navaho; Intended to have two pads. The Navaho program was cancelled before construction began. Located adjacent to LC-31 and LC-32.		28.451345°N 80.551200°W
Launch Complex 28	Unbuilt	No known launch vehicle or missile was assigned to LC-28. Intended to have two pads and a single blockhouse.		28.497930°N 80.549419°W
Launch Complex 30A	Inactive	Retired: Pershing 1		28.43945°N 80.58061°W
Launch Complex 30B	Inactive	Cancelled: Pershing 1 Pad has never been built.		28.43945°N 80.58061°W
Launch Complex 31	Inactive	Retired: Minuteman, Pershing 1a Used as a burial vault for pieces of Space Shuttle Challenger.		28°27′09″N 80°33′22″W
Launch Complex 32	Inactive	Retired: Minuteman		28°27′09″N 80°33′22″W
Launch Complex 33	Unbuilt	Cancelled: Titan III X-20; Never built due to cancellation of the Dyna Soar program. SLC-37 now sits on the site.		28.531986°N 80.566821°W
Launch Complex 34	Inactive	Retired: Saturn I, Saturn IB; Site of the Apollo 1 fire.	SA-1, AS-201, Apollo 7	28°31′19″N 80°33′41″W
Launch Complex 35	Unbuilt	Cancelled: Navaho; Not built due to the cancellation of the Navaho program.		
Launch Complex 38	Unbuilt	Cancelled: Atlas-Agena, Atlas-Centaur; Proposed for several Atlas variants, never had any specific location selected.		N/A
Launch Complex 42	Unbuilt	Cancelled: Titan IIIC; Proposed as a third pad to the Integrate-Transfer-Launch Complex. Cancelled because it would have been too close to LC-39A.		28°33′59″N 80°36′13″W
Launch Complex 43	Demolished	Retired: Super Loki; Demolished to make way for SLC-46.		28°27′30″N 80°31′42″W
Launch Complex 44	Demolished	Retired: Dragon; Demolished to make way for the submarine facility at Port Canaveral.		28°25′02″N 80°35′45″W
Launch Complex 45	Demolished	Cancelled: Roland; Construction plans scrapped before any missiles were launched. LC-46 now sits on the site.		28°27′30″N 80°31′42″W
Launch Complex 47	Inactive	Retired: Sounding Rockets, Super Loki, Super Loki Lite Star, LOFT-1		28.549123°N 80.5674339°W
Space Launch Complex 50	Undeveloped	Cancelled: Starship; Proposed as a second heavy-lift launch pad at the northern end of Cape Canaveral, joining SLC-37.		28.548838°N 80.576735°W
Space Launch Complex 51	Undeveloped	Proposed: Dark Eagle		28°26′16″N 80°33′49″W

=== Other sites ===
Site	Status	Uses	Coordinates
Atlantic Missile Range drop zone	Inactive	Retired: High Virgo, Bold Orion, Hound Dog, Skybolt	
Grand Turk Auxiliary AFB, Grand Turk Island drop zone	Inactive	Retired: Arcas (All-Purpose Rocket for Collecting Atmospheric Soundings)	
Mobile Launch Area	Inactive	Retired: Lark, Matador, Snark	
Landing Zone 40	Active	Current: Falcon 9 landings, Falcon Heavy landings	28.563119°N 80.574331°W
Eastern SLBM Launch Area	Active	Current: Trident II; Retired: Polaris, Poseidon, Trident	
Shuttle Landing Facility (Launch and Landing Facility)	Active	Current: X-37B landings Future: Dream Chaser landings Retired: Space Shuttle landings, Pegasus	28.615°N 80.6945°W
Cape Canaveral Space Force Station Skid Strip	Active	Current: Pegasus XL; Retired: Navaho, Pegasus	28.468°N 80.567°W
Patrick Space Force Base	Inactive	Retired: Matador	

== See also ==
- Air Force Space and Missile Museum
- List of Vandenberg Space Force Base launch facilities
