= Cape Canaveral Launch Complex 45 =

Cape Canaveral Space Force Station launch complex

Launch Complex 45
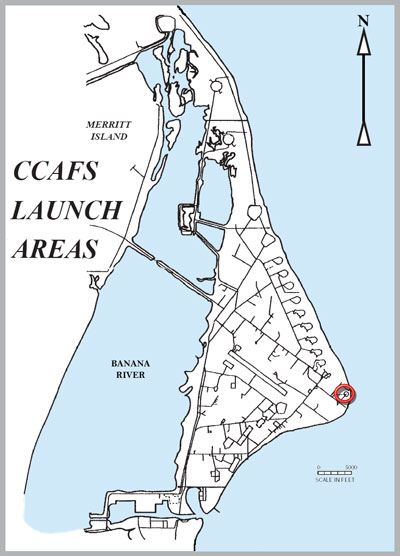
- A map of Cape Canaveral Space Force Station, with LC-45 circled.
- Interactive map of Launch Complex 45
- Launch site: Cape Canaveral Air Force Station
- Coordinates: 28°27′30″N 80°31′42″W
- Time zone: UTC−05:00 (EST)
  - Summer (DST): UTC−04:00 (EDT)
- Short name: LC-45
- Operator: United States Space Force; NASA
- Total launches: 0
- Launch pad: 0
Launch history
- Status: Demolished

Launch Complex 45 (LC-45) is a former launch complex on Cape Canaveral Space Force Station created to launch the Roland missile. It was located south of the then-extant LC-43, with a flat launch pad. An armored vehicle was to serve served both as a launch pad and a blockhouse, similar to regular operations of the system. However, it was never used prior to its destruction, and Launch Complex 46 is now in its location.
