= Cape Canaveral Space Force Museum =

- Location within Florida
- Former name: Air Force Space and Missile Museum
- Established: 1966
- Location: Cape Canaveral Space Force Station, Brevard County, near Cape Canaveral, Florida (main center); 100 Space Port Way; Port Canaveral, Brevard County (History Center)
- Coordinates: 28°26′39″N 80°34′16″W
- Type: Aerospace museum
- Website: www.ccspacemuseum.org

The Cape Canaveral Space Force Museum (formerly the Air Force Space and Missile Museum) is located at Launch Complex 26 at Cape Canaveral Space Force Station, Florida. It includes artifacts from the early American space program and includes an outdoor area displaying rockets, missiles, and space-related equipment chronicling the space and missile history of the US Air Force, the US Space Force and other military branches.

The museum is accessible to U.S. citizens and residents only as a part of five tours offered by Canaveral Tours. Free tours are also offered by Space Launch Delta 45 as part of the Cape Canaveral Space Force Station Historical Tour. Space Launch Delta 45 was formed out of the 45th Space Wing in May 2021 following establishment of the Space Force.

The Sands Space History Center, a companion to the museum, is open to the general public six days a week. The History Center is located just outside the south gate of Cape Canaveral Air Force Station.

A part of the first stage of a Titan rocket was transferred to the museum in 2023.

== Facilities ==
=== Sands Space History Center ===
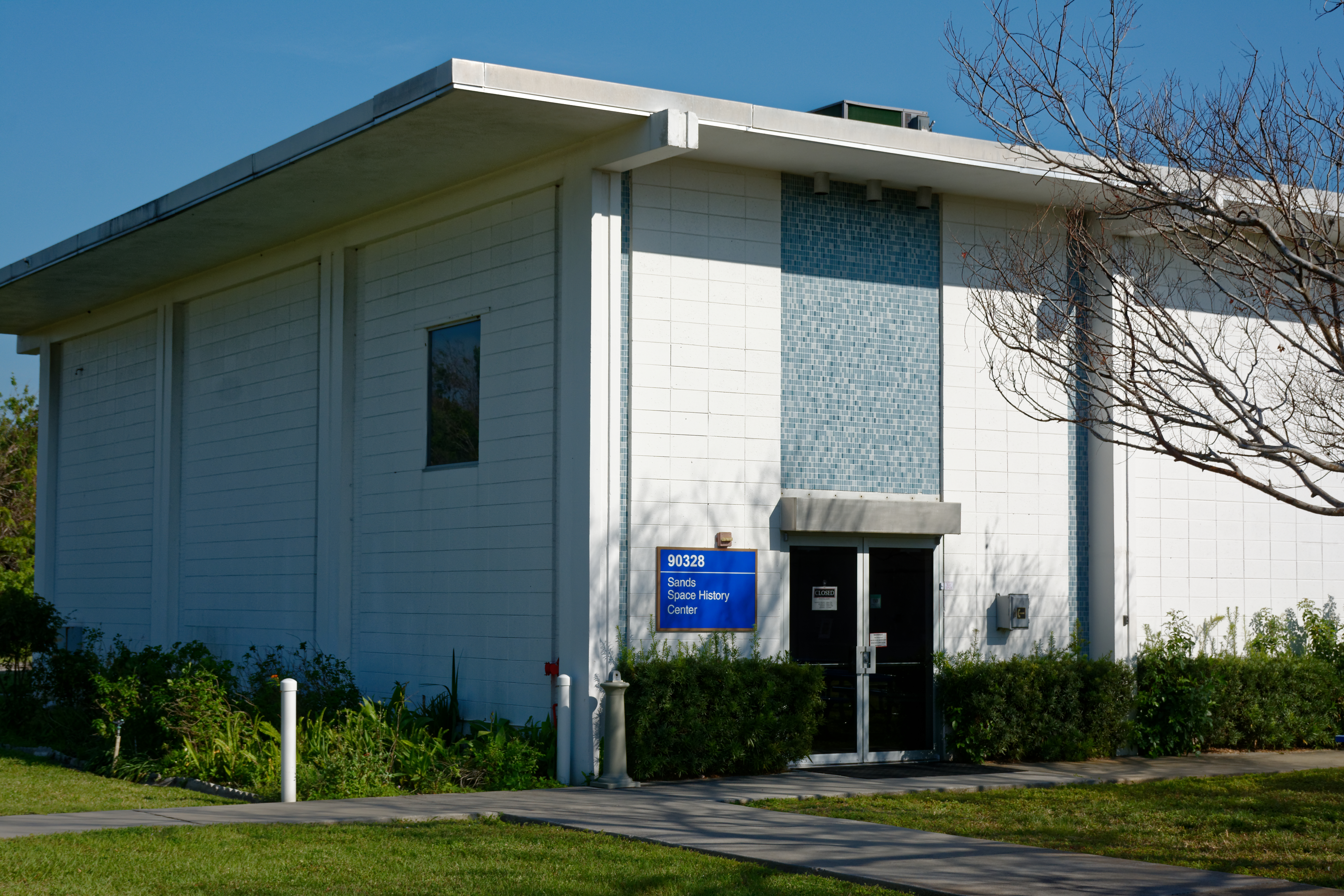
Sands Space History Center

The Sands Space History Center (formerly known as the United States Air Force Space and Missile History Center) is an extension of the Air Force Space and Missile Museum outside the gate 1 of the Cape Canaveral Space Force Station which opened to the public August 14, 2010. It is located in a 3,200-square-foot (300 m^{2}) facility and highlights the progress and history of the space program. The museum features displays which chronicle the story of each of the launch pads from its establishment in 1949 as the Joint Long Range Proving Ground. Exhibits contain artifacts dating back to the 1950s and include parts to launch vehicles and control systems.

Unlike the Air Force Space and Missile Museum, its sister museum which is located inside gates of the Cape Canaveral Space Force Station, the center does not require special arrangements or a fee-based tour to visit. Admission is free and it is open to the public six days per week.

The museum reopened the Center on 17 June 2025 after a renovation. This followed a significant financial donation by Jared Isaacman a year prior.

=== Hangar C ===
During the museum's early history, many of the museum's missiles were on display in an outdoor area known as the "Rocket Garden". Over the years, the central Florida heat, humidity, and ocean air gradually degraded the outward appearance and internal structure of most of the exhibits. The missiles were removed from outdoor display and restored. They were then placed in storage until a suitable display area could be found. Eventually, historic Hangar C was secured as the future public display area. The oldest hangar on the Cape (Hangars A and B were built on Patrick Space Force Base), for a time served as a central missile assembly facility for nearly all Cape launch activity. Once it was determined that Hangar C would serve as a central display area for much of the museum's large artifacts, it underwent extensive renovation to make it suitable for public access. In early 2020 public tours conducted by the Kennedy Space Center Visitor Complex began making stops at Hangar C as part of the newly introduced "Rise to Space" tour (separate and distinct from the "Early Space" tour).

A Navaho missile from the collection was placed back on display at the south gate of the station in 2021.

== Gallery ==
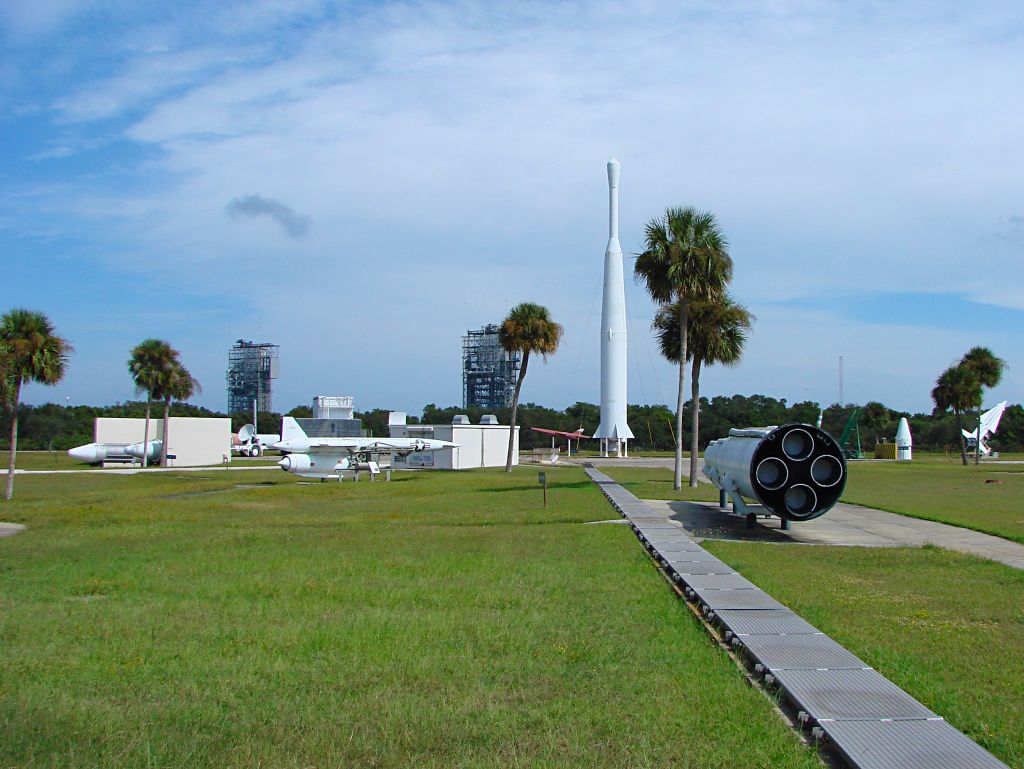
Rocket garden before artifact relocation

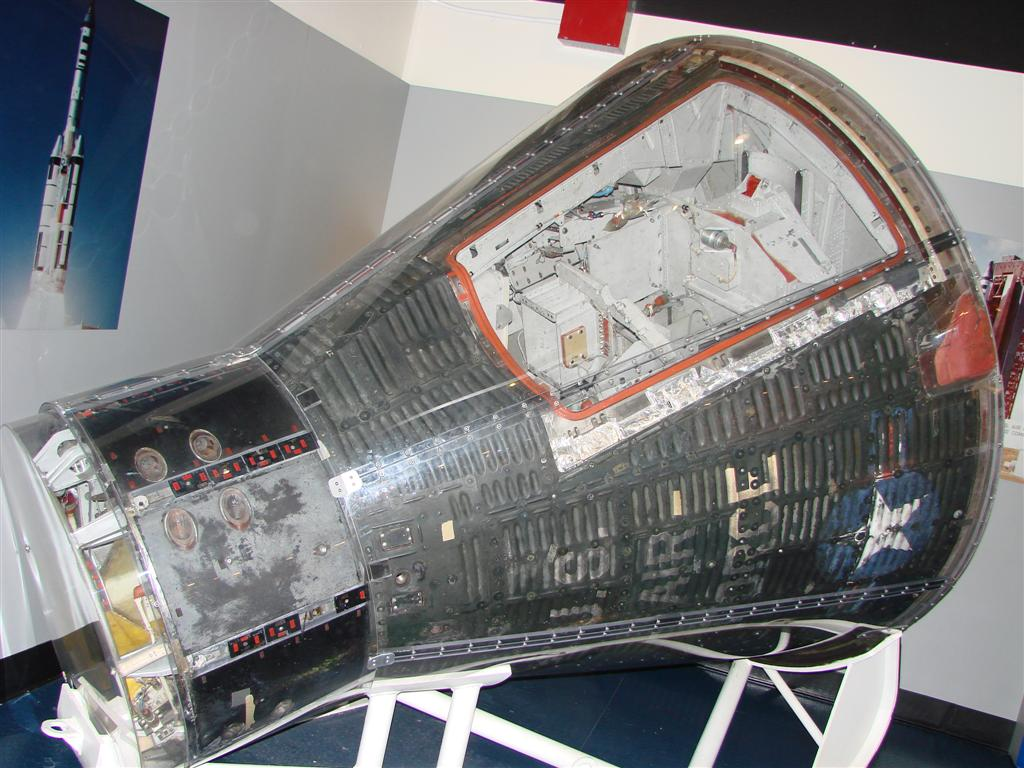
Gemini 2 spacecraft

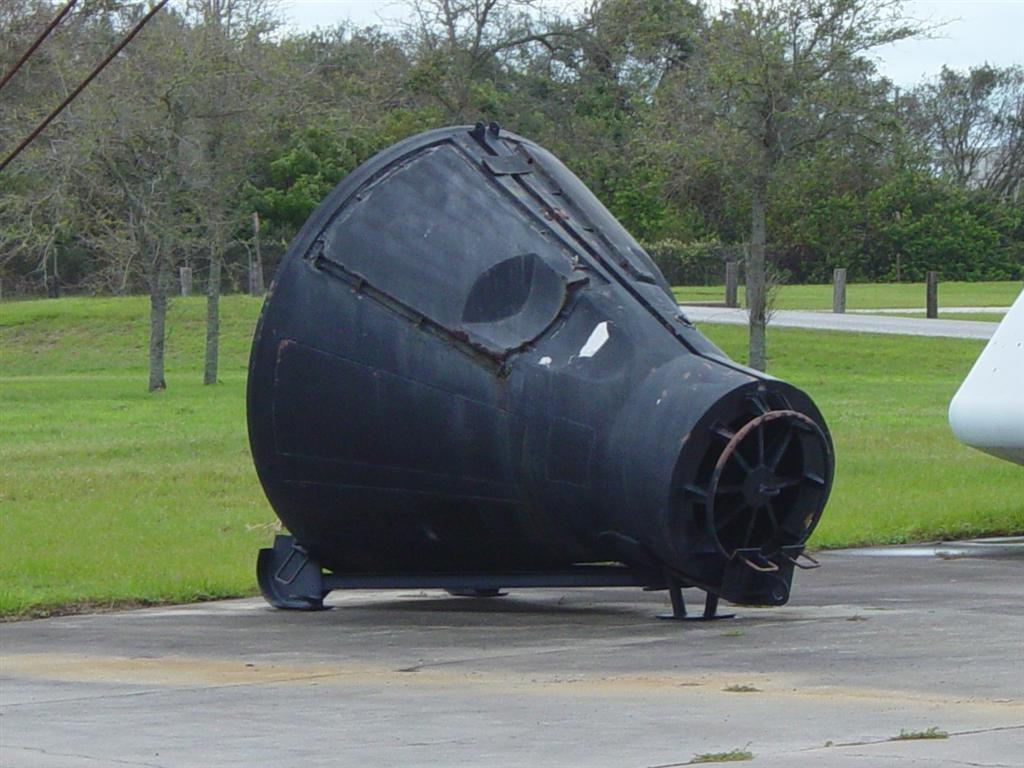
Boilerplate version of Gemini spacecraft (now on display in Hangar C)

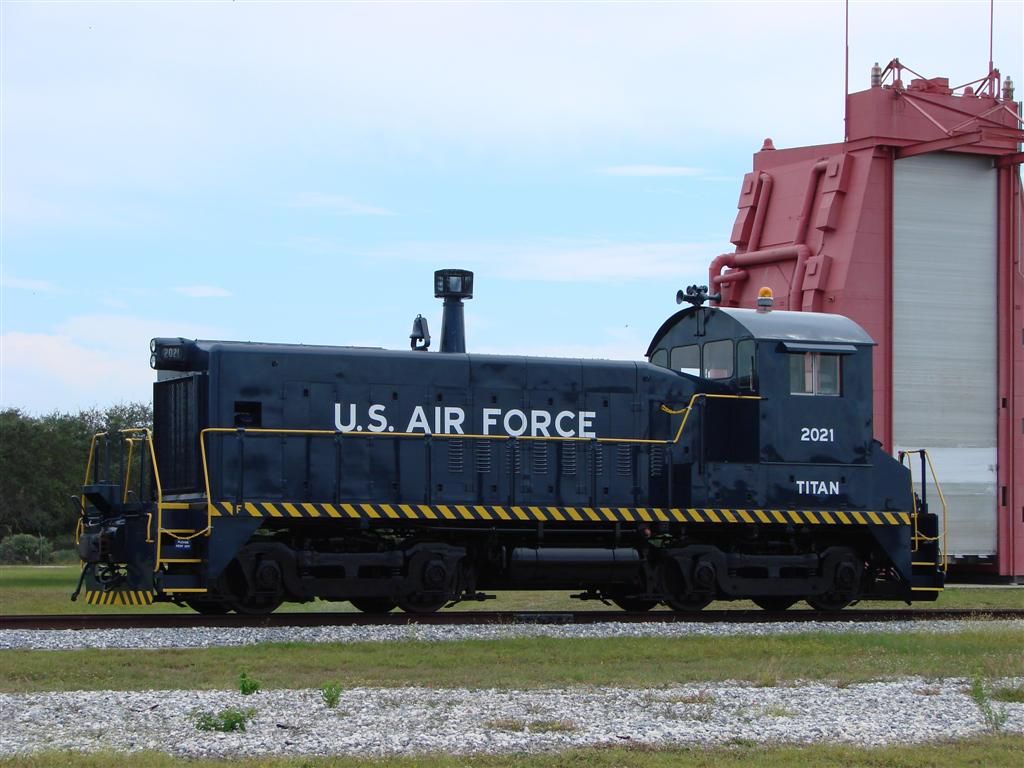
EMD SW8 switching locomotive from the U.S. Air Force Titan program; LC-19 white room at right (interior not accessible)

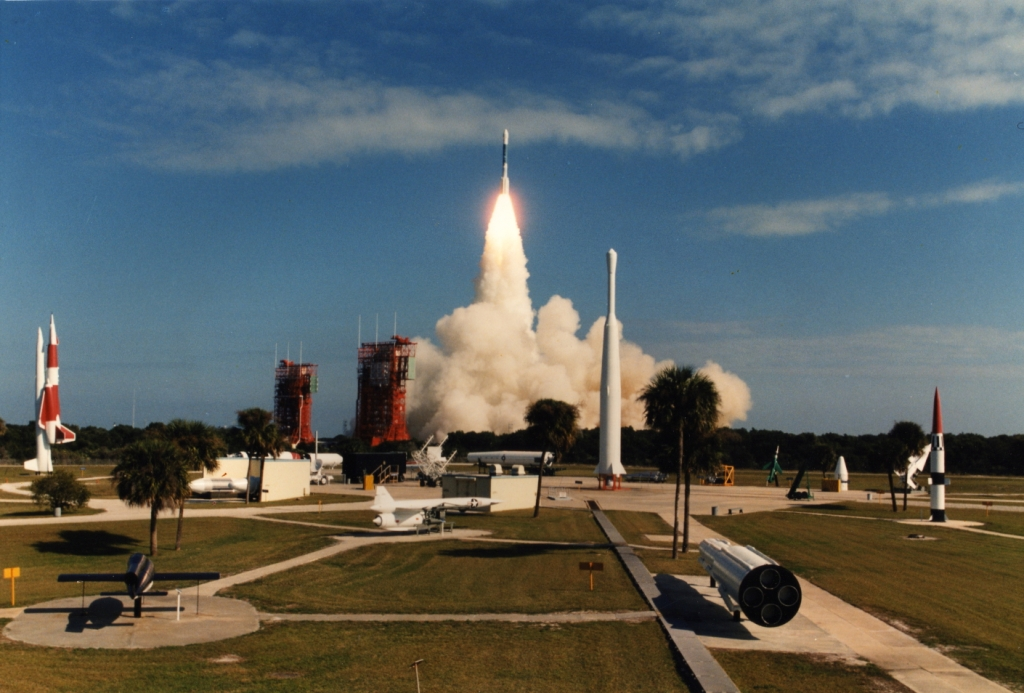
A Delta II launch at the adjacent SLC-17B, as seen from rocket garden

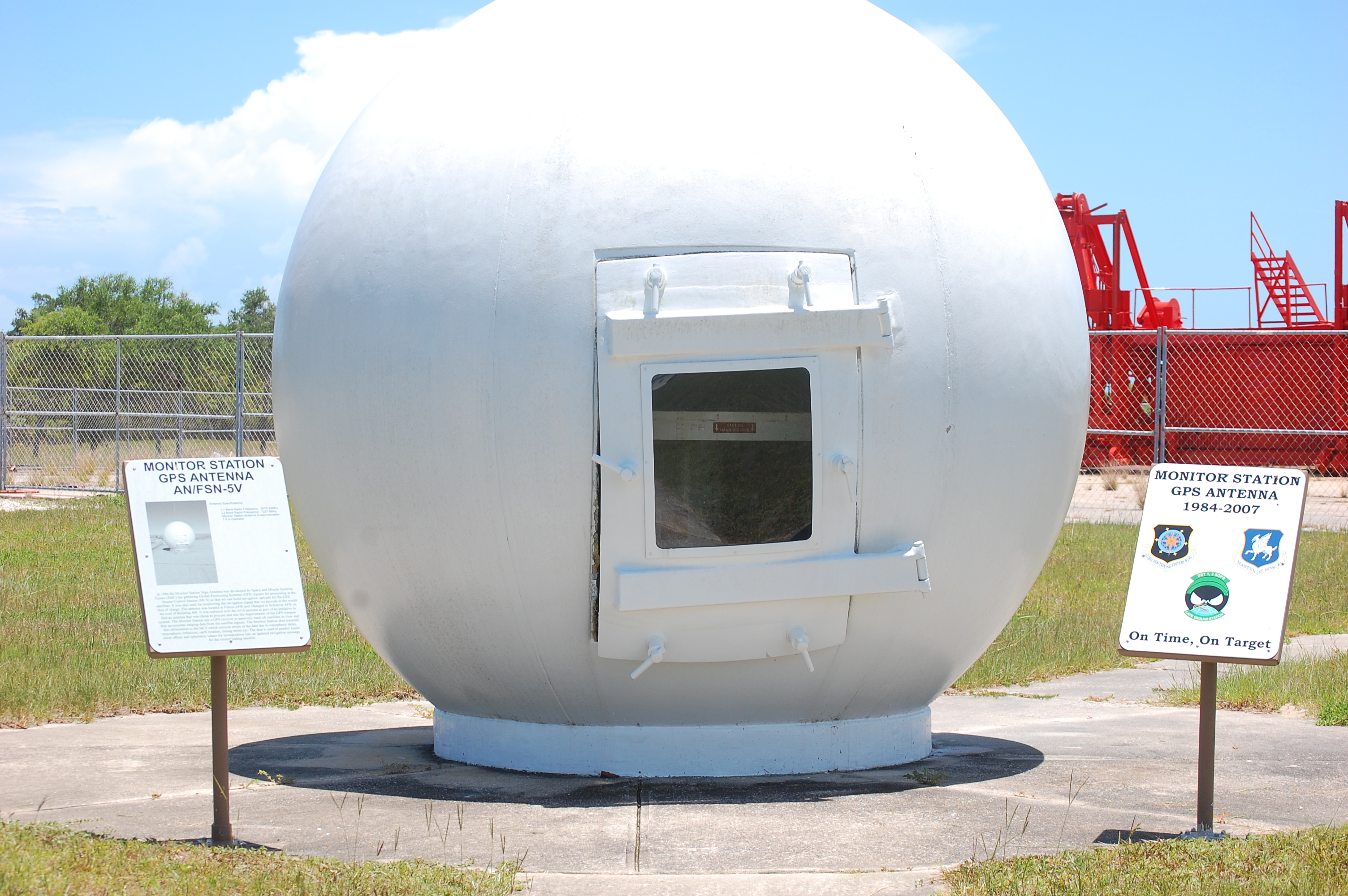
GPS ground monitor station

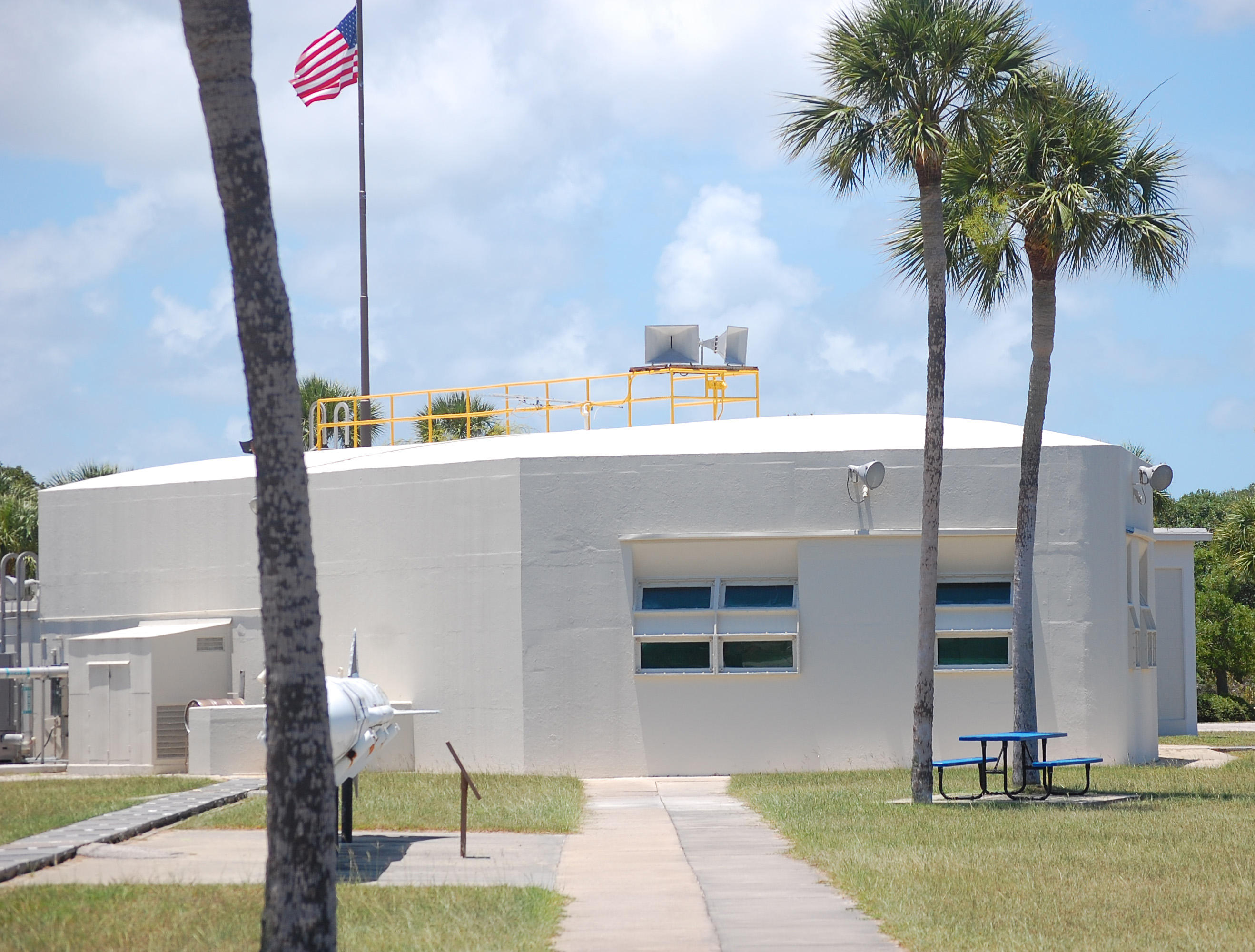
LC-26 blockhouse, now housing part of the museum

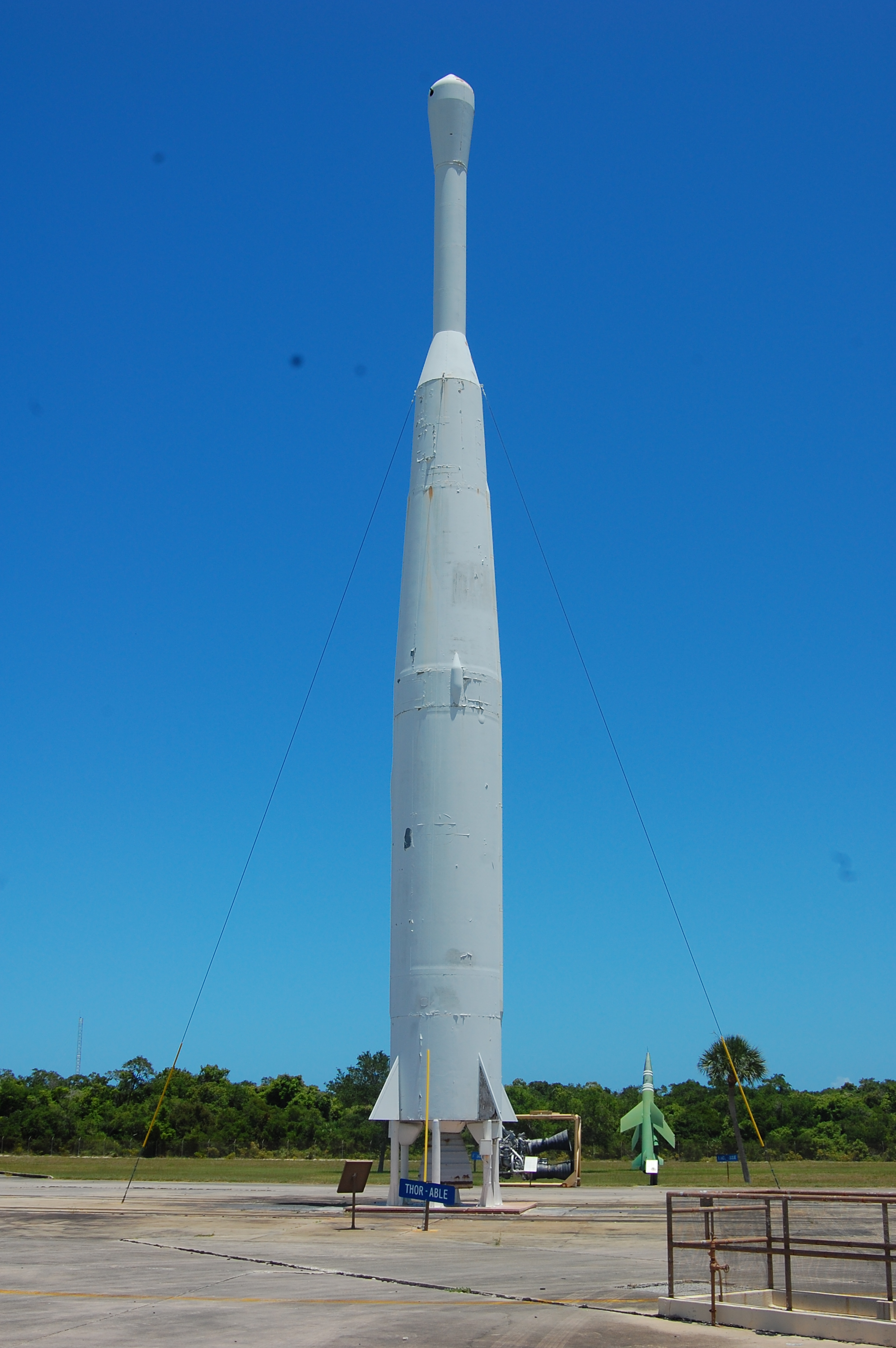
Thor-Able (now on display in Hangar C)

== See also ==
- Cape Canaveral Launch Complex 26
- Kennedy Space Center Visitor Complex
- Titan Missile Museum
