= Jason (rocket) =

Jason (Argo-E5)
Size
- Diameter: 0.58 m
- Mass: 3,330 kg
- Stages: MGR-1 Honest John; Nike; Nike; Recruit; T-55

Launch history
- Total launches: 22
- Success(es): 20
- Failure: 2
- First flight: 11 July 1958
- Last flight: 2 September 1958

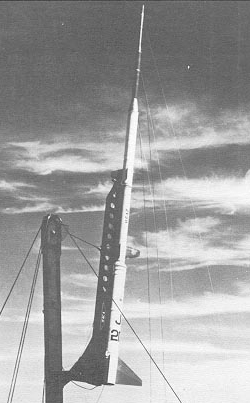
Argo E-5 (Jason) rocket

Jason was an American sounding rocket with 5 stages. The Jason was launched 22 times in 1958. The Jason could carry a payload of 125 pounds (57 kg) to an altitude of 500 mi (800 km). The launch thrust was 82,100 pounds-force (365 kN), the launch mass 7,340 lb (3330 kg), the diameter 58 centimeters (23 in) and the length 17.49 meters (57.36 ft).

The design of the Jason rocket originates from an unnamed test vehicle made by NACA's Langley Aeronautical Laboratory Pilotless Aircraft Research Division (PARD), where it was designed to study the atmospheric heating and other effects resulting from hypersonic launches. Research from this rocket not only contributed to the understanding of hypersonic aerodynamics, but also to the development of the blunt heatshield design of Project Mercury. The first launch was on August 24, 1956, during which the rocket reached a maximum speed of Mach 15, though later launches would surpass Mach 18.

This design would later be adopted by Aerolab—who would give it the name Argo E-5—for the Air Force (AFSWC). This research vehicle was made for use in the Jason program, which measured the trapped radiation from the Argus nuclear tests in the latter half of 1958. It was launched from Cape Kennedy, Wallops, and Puerto Rico. It consisted of an Honest John first stage plus two Nike stages, a Recruit stage and a final T-55 as the fifth stage.
