= Pershing missile launches =

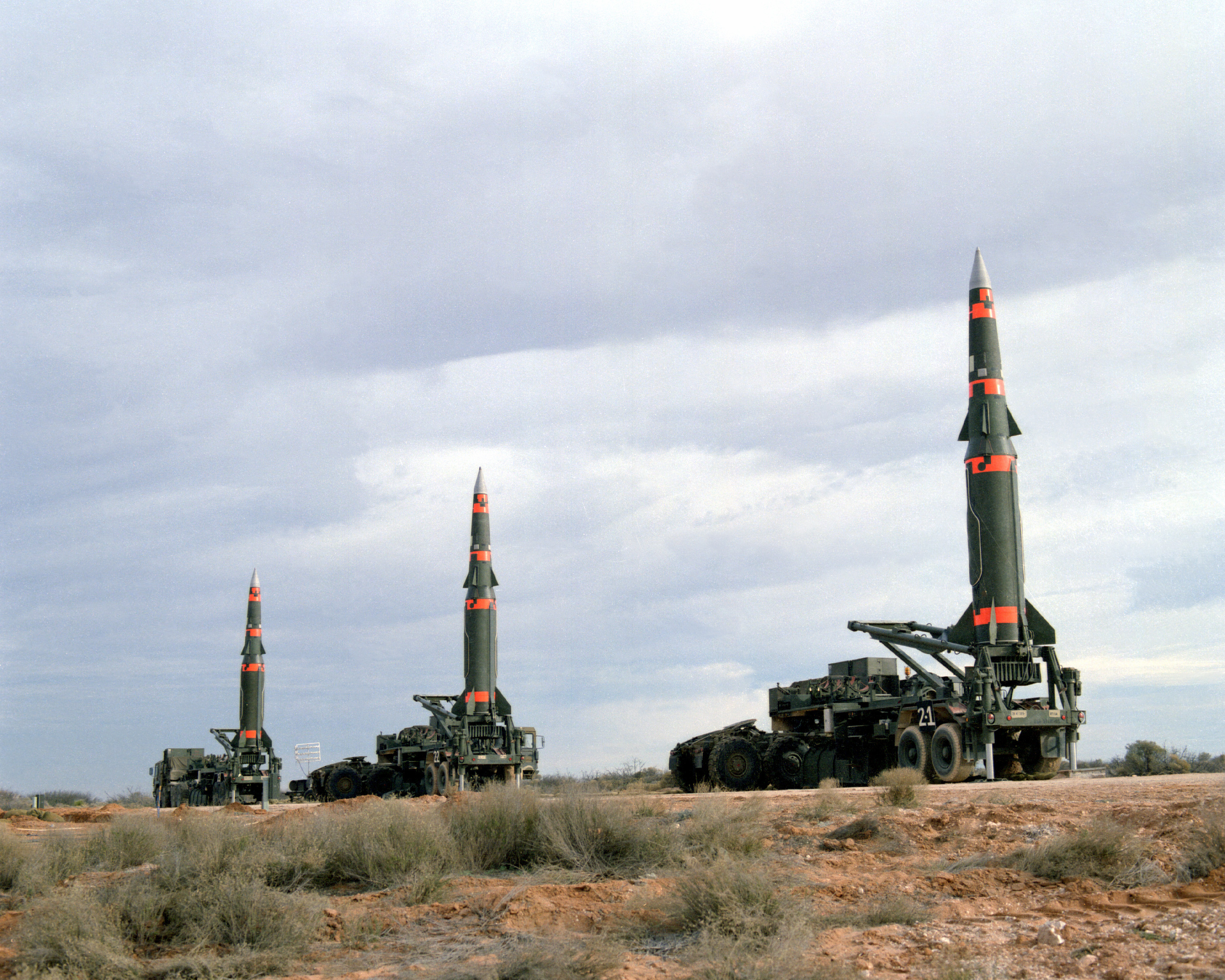
Three single-stage Pershing II missiles prepared for launch at McGregor Range (1 December 1987)

From 1960 to 1988 there were Pershing missile launches for testing from various sites in the US. The systems included the Pershing 1 Field Artillery Missile System, the Pershing 1a Field Artillery Missile System and the Pershing II Weapon System. Initial launches were from what is now the Eastern Range at Cape Canaveral, Florida using Launch Complex 30A using the dismounted erector launcher. Later launches were from the full transporter erector launcher (TEL). Further launches were conducted at White Sands Missile Range (WSMR) using tactical equipment. The Pershing 1 and 1a had a range of 740 kilometres (460 mi), thus launches were from various subinstallations into WSMR. The two-stage Pershing II had a range of 1,770 kilometres (1,100 mi), thus launches at WSMR used a single-stage missile with two-stage launches at Cape Canaveral.

== Purpose ==
Initial missile launches were for research and development purposes. There were 52 R&D launches in the Pershing 1 development cycle.

In 1965, the Army contracted with the Applied Physics Laboratory (APL) of Johns Hopkins University to develop and implement a test and evaluation program. APL developed the Pershing Operational Test Program (OTP), provided technical support to the Pershing Operational Test Unit (POTU), identified problem areas and improved the performance and survivability of the Pershing systems.

POTU planned, scheduled, and executed the tests, evaluations, and missile firings to support OTP. POTU would select three firing batteries from the 56th Field Artillery Command in West Germany to participate in Follow-on Operational Tests (FOT) using an unannounced field alert status verifications (FASV) at the Quick Reaction Alert (QRA) site. POTU selected missiles, equipment and personnel (colloquially referred to as a tap) for transport to either Cape Canaveral or White Sands Missile Range. After arrival, the missiles and launchers would be equipped with telemetry and the missiles would have range safety equipment installed for in-flight destruction if needed. Shoots were supported by elements of the 3rd Battalion, 9th Field Artillery Regiment from Fort Sill, Oklahoma. The missile crews would perform tactical countdowns and launch the missile. Data collectors from APL observed the crews and equipment. After the shoot, data and evaluations were compiled into reports of the performance estimates of the operational capabilities of the Pershing missile system.

== Markings and telemetry ==
Initial test missiles were painted white with black striping in a roll pattern that aided in tracking and observation of roll. Tactical missiles were painted green; first olive drab then later forest green. A very few missiles were painted in woodland camouflage. Pershing 1 and 1a missiles tapped for a shoot would have orange stripes added to the rocket motors and the guidance section and had a dummy warhead with black and white roll pattern. Pershing II missiles had orange and yellow stripes added for tracking. The white tip of the Pershing II was not a marking, it was a radome formed of a radar transparent ablative heat shield with the fuze at the very tip in black.

The missiles had dummy warheads that contained telemetry equipment that monitored missile operation and radioed it back to the ground station. The Pershing 1 and Pershing 1a programmer test station and the erector launcher had a recorder installed to monitor all signals; for Pershing II this was installed on the erector launcher.

== Postal covers ==
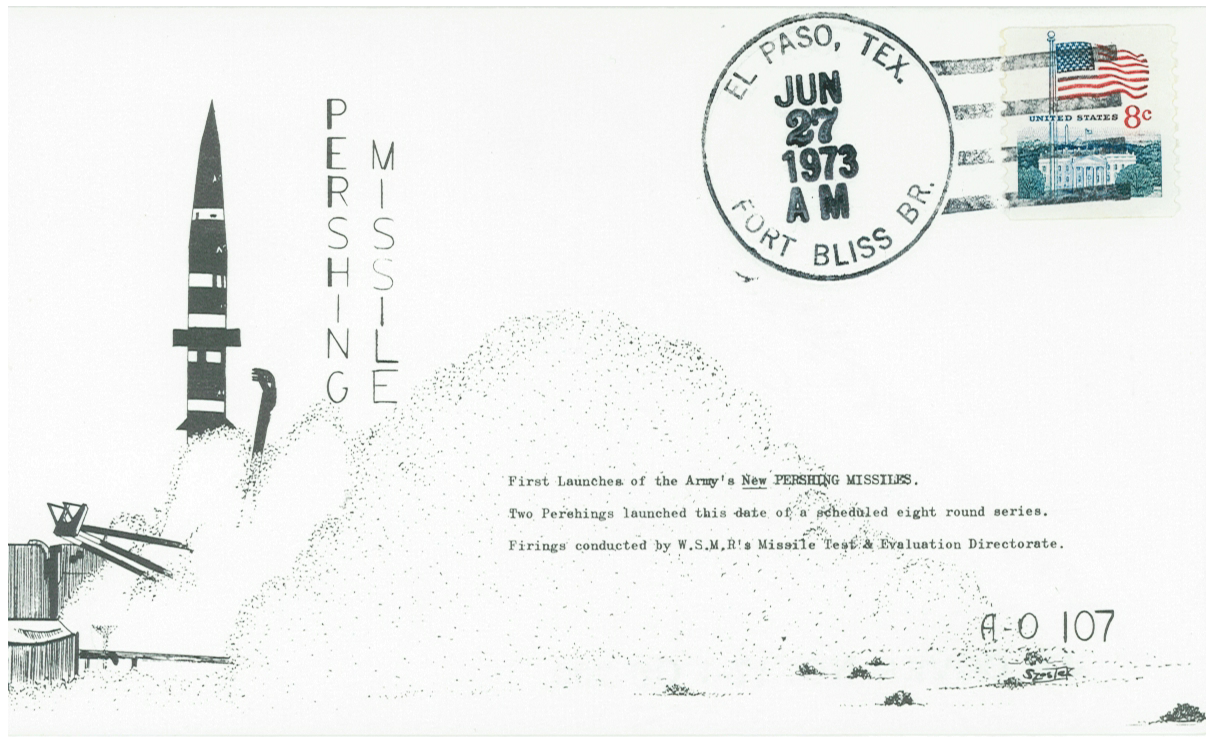
Postal cover for the launch of Pershing 1a missile (27 June 1973)

The post offices at White Sands Missile Range and Cape Canaveral issued event covers for all launches. Most covers were created using a rubber stamp with the image of a generic missile and a stamped date and time. The first eight launches of the Pershing 1a were recognized with a specially printed cover.

== Sites ==
- Eastern Range, Cape Canaveral, Florida
  - Launch Complex 30: 49 launches
    - Launch Complex 30A
    - Launch Complex 30D
    - Launch Complex 30E
  - Launch Complex 31A: 10 launches
  - Launch Complex 16: 128 launches
- White Sands Missile Range, New Mexico
  - Hueco Range, Fort Bliss, Texas
  - McGregor Range, Fort Bliss, Texas
  - Fort Wingate, New Mexico
  - Gilson Butte, Utah
  - Black Mesa Test Range, Blanding, Utah
  - Green River Launch Complex, Utah

== Units ==
- 7th Army: Seventh United States Army
  - 4/41 FA: 4th Battalion, 41st Field Artillery Regiment
  - 1/41 FA: 1st Battalion, 41st Field Artillery Regiment
  - 1/81 FA: 1st Battalion, 81st Field Artillery Regiment
  - 3/84 FA: 3rd Battalion, 84th Field Artillery Regiment
- German: German Air Force
  - FKW1: Missile Wing 1 (German: Flugkörpergeschwader 1)
    - FKGrp 12: Missile Group 12 (German: Flugkörpergruppe 12)
    - FKGrp 13: Missile Group 13 (German: Flugkörpergruppe 13)
  - FKW2: Missile Wing 2 (German: Flugkörpergeschwader 2)
    - FKGrp 21: Missile Group 21 (German: Flugkörpergruppe 21)
    - FKGrp 22: Missile Group 23 (German: Flugkörpergruppe 22)
- ARMTE: Army Materiel Test and Evaluation Directorate
- 2/44 FA: 2nd Missile Battalion, 44th Artillery Regiment

== Launches ==
- ASP: Annual service practice
- GRAD: Graduation practice
- BRD: Bundesrepublik Deutschland; West Germany
- DASO: demonstration and shakedown operations launch
- FOT: follow-on test
- Improved Pershing 1a: Block 7 modifications adding the Azimuth Reference Unit and the Sequential Launch Adapter
- TEL: transporter erector launcher

=== Pershing 1 ===
Date	Time GMT	Site	ID	Unit/Test
25 February 1960	18:02	Canaveral LC30A	105	P-01 First test launch
20 April 1960	18:30	Canaveral LC30A	106	P-02 test
10 May 1960	16:00	Canaveral LC30A	107	P-03 test
9 June 1960	16:19	Canaveral LC30A	108	P-04 test
30 June 1960	16:00	Canaveral LC30A	109	P-05 test
26 July 1960	16:00	Canaveral LC30A	TEL 110	P-06 test
28 September 1960	19:38	Canaveral LC30A	TEL 205	P-07 test
16 November 1960	18:25	Canaveral LC30A	TEL 206	P-08 test
12 December 1960	18:42	Canaveral LC30A	TEL 207	P-09 test
6 January 1961	0:10	Canaveral LC30A	208	P-10 test (failure)
26 January 1961	0:30	Canaveral LC30A	209	P-11 test
16 February 1961	1:27	Canaveral LC30A	210	P-12 test
2 March 1961	5:07	Canaveral LC30A	211	P-13 test
16 March 1961	1:19	Canaveral LC30A	212	P-14 test
21 April 1961	15:53	Canaveral LC30A	308	P-15 test
19 May 1961	2:00	Canaveral LC30A	310	P-16 test
9 June 1961	5:11	Canaveral LC30A	311	P-17 test
1 July 1961	2:00	Canaveral LC30A	312	P-18 test
20 July 1961	2:00	Canaveral LC30A	313	P-19 test
10 August 1961		Canaveral LC30A	315	P-20 test (failure)
22 August 1961		Canaveral LC30A	316	P-21 test
13 September 1961		Canaveral LC30A	TEL 318	P-22 test
26 September 1961		Canaveral LC30A	319	P-23 test
10 October 1961		Canaveral LC30A	320	P-24 test
2 November 1961		Canaveral LC30A	322	P-25 test
15 November 1961		Canaveral LC30A	323	P-26 test
1 December 1961		Canaveral LC30A	324	P-27
28 December 1961		Canaveral LC30A	327	P-28 test
16 January 1962	19:00	Canaveral LC30A	334	P-29 test
25 January 1962	3:00	Canaveral LC30A	332	P-30 test
19 February 1962		Canaveral LC30A	335	P-31 test
15 March 1962	11:30	Canaveral LC30A	328	P-32 test
4 April 1962		Canaveral LC30A	326	P-33 test
24 April 1962	17:00	Canaveral LC30A	337	P-34 test (failure)
27 April 1962		Canaveral LC30A	329	P-35 test
9 May 1962	13:30	Canaveral LC30A	330	P-36 test (failure)
5 June 1962	2:00	Canaveral LC30A	339	P-37 test
14 June 1962		Canaveral LC30A	342	P-38 test (failure)
21 August 1962		Canaveral LC30A	338	P-39 test
26 September 1962		Canaveral LC30A	347	P-40 test
22 October 1962		Canaveral LC30A	TEL 351	P-41 test
15 November 1962		Canaveral LC30A	348	P-42 test
27 November 1962		Canaveral LC30A	354	P-43 test
10 December 1962		Canaveral LC30A	353	P-44 test
17 January 1963		Canaveral LC30A	358	P-45 test
30 January 1963		Canaveral LC30A	363	P-46 test
14 February 1963		Canaveral LC30A	403	P-47 test
26 February 1963		Canaveral LC30A	406	P-48 test
4 March 1963		Canaveral LC30D	405	P-49 test
13 March 1963		Canaveral LC30A	407	P-50 test
21 March 1963		Canaveral LC30A	410	P-51 test
3 April 1963		Canaveral LC30A	408	P-52 Last R&D test
6 April 1963	0:45	Canaveral LC30A	511	P-53 IST/Orlando
12 April 1963		Canaveral LC30A	515	P-54 test
17 April 1963	16:39	Canaveral LC30E	520	P-55 test
24 April 1963	20:30	Canaveral LC30A	521	P-56 test
20 August 1963		Bliss		X-57 2/44 FA operational test
27 August 1963		Bliss		X-58 operational test
24 September 1963	17:06	Black Mesa		X-59 operational test
25 September 1963	13:40	Black Mesa		X-60 operational test
25 September 1963	21:40	Black Mesa		X-61 McGregor target operational test
27 September 1963	13:40	Black Mesa		X-62 operational test
27 September 1963	20:40	Black Mesa		X-63 operational test
14 October 1963		Fort Wingate		X-64 operational test
16 October 1963		Fort Wingate		X-65 operational test
18 October 1963		Fort Wingate		X-66 operational test
21 October 1963		Fort Wingate		X-67 operational test
23 October 1963		Fort Wingate		X-68 FW-5 operational test (failure)
28 October 1963		Fort Wingate		X-69 operational test
14 November 1963	14:30	Fort Wingate		X-70 4/41st FA operational test
20 November 1963	17:31	Fort Wingate		X-71 4/41st FA FW-8 operational test
5 December 1963		Fort Wingate		X-72 4/41st FA operational test
24 February 1964	14:57	Fort Wingate		X-73 Fort Sill operational test
25 February 1964		Fort Wingate		X-75 operational test (failure)
25 February 1964	0:17	Fort Wingate		X-74 Fort Sill operational test
28 February 1964		Fort Wingate		X-76 operational test
21 April 1964		Bliss	AO-12	X-77 German operational test; FKGrp 12 GRAD
23 April 1964		Bliss		X-78 German operational test
17 July 1964		Black Mesa	AO-14	X-79 German operational test; FKGrp 13 GRAD
22 July 1964		Black Mesa	AO-15	X-80 German operational test; FKGrp 13 GRAD
18 November 1964		Bliss		X-81 Fort Sill 3/84 FA operational test
18 November 1964		Bliss		X-82 Fort Sill 3/84 FA operational test
19 November 1964		Fort Bliss		X-84 3/84 FA operational test (failure: overshoot into Colorado)
19 November 1964		Bliss		X-83 Fort Sill 3/84 FA operational test
28 January 1965		Fort Wingate	T1	X-85 Fort Sill operational test
3 February 1965		Fort Wingate	T2	X-86 Fort Sill
3 February 1965		Fort Wingate	T3	X-87 Fort Sill
12 February 1965		Fort Wingate	T4	X-88 Fort Sill operational test
26 May 1965		Gilson Butte		X-89 Fort Sill operational test
27 May 1965		Gilson Butte		X-90 7th ArmyB4
2 June 1965		Gilson Butte		X-91 Fort Sill (failure: overshoot McGregor)
16 June 1965		Gilson Butte		X-92 Fort Sill operational test
6 October 1965		Gilson Butte	AO-28	X-93 BRD (failure); FKGrp 12 ASP
6 October 1965		Gilson Butte		X-94 BRD
13 October 1965		Gilson Butte		X-95 operational test (failure)
31 January 1966		Bliss	AO-30	X-96 German operational test; FKGrp 13 ASP
14 February 1966	16:52	Bliss		X-97 Fort Sill operational test
16 February 1966		Bliss		X-98 Fort Sill
22 June 1966		Gilson Butte		X-99 Fort Sill operational test
27 June 1966		Gilson Butte		X-100 7th Army
19 July 1966		Black Mesa		X-101 Fort Sill
26 July 1966		Black Mesa	AO-37	X-103 operational test; FKGrp 21GRAD
26 July 1966		Black Mesa	AO-38	X-104 operational test; FKGrp 21GRAD
26 July 1966		Black Mesa		X-105 operational test
26 July 1966		Black Mesa		X-106 operational test
26 July 1966		Black Mesa		X-107 operational test
26 July 1966		Black Mesa		X-108 operational test
26 July 1966		Black Mesa		X-102 operational test
21 October 1966		Gilson Butte	AO-41	X-111 operational test; FKGrp 12ASP
21 October 1966		Gilson Butte		X-110 operational test
21 October 1966		Gilson Butte		X-109 operational test
26 October 1966		Gilson Butte	AO-43	X-112 Fort Sill; FKGrp 22 GRAD
4 November 1966		Gilson Butte	AO-44	X-113 BRD; FKGrp 22 GRAD
7 March 1967	16:00	Black Mesa		X-115
7 March 1967	16:00	Black Mesa		X-114
13 March 1967		Black Mesa		X-116 7th Army operational test
13 March 1967		Black Mesa		X-117 7th Army operational test
15 March 1967		Black Mesa	AO-49	BRD; FKGrp 13 ASP
28 March 1967		Black Mesa	DASO-7	X-118 7th Army demonstration and shakedown operations launch
29 March 1967	0:30	Black Mesa		X-120 7th Army operational test
29 March 1967	0:30	Black Mesa	DASO-8	X-119 7th Army demonstration and shakedown operations launch
29 March 1967	1:00	Black Mesa		X-121 7th Army operational test
2 June 1967		Black Mesa	T01	X-122 7th Army operational test
2 June 1967		Black Mesa	T02	X-123 7th Army operational test
9 June 1967		Black Mesa	T03	X-124 operational test
22 June 1967		Black Mesa	T04	X-125 operational test
23 June 1967		Black Mesa	T05	X-126 7th Army operational test
29 August 1967	20:10	Black Mesa		X-127 operational test
29 August 1967	20:15	Black Mesa		X-128 operational test
29 August 1967	20:30	Black Mesa		X-129 operational test
29 August 1967	21:00	Black Mesa		X-130 operational test
12 September 1967	7:00	Black Mesa	AO-53	X-131 BRD; FKGrp 12 ASP
12 September 1967	7:48	Black Mesa		X-132 operational test The round overshot, impacting near the town of Los Pilares, Chihuahua, Mexico, a distance of 558 miles.
15 November 1967	15:00	Black Mesa		X-133 7th Army
15 November 1967	15:30	Black Mesa		X-134 7th Army
15 November 1967	17:45	Black Mesa		X-135 Fort Sill
5 March 1968		Gilson Butte		X-136 operational test
5 March 1968		Gilson Butte		X-137 operational test
16 March 1968		Hueco	AO-60	BRD; FKGrp 21 ASP
16 March 1968		Hueco	AO-61	BRD; FKGrp 13 ASP
29 April 1968		Gilson Butte		X-139 operational test
20 June 1968		Gilson Butte	AO-64	X-140 BRD F1; 4./FKGrp 12 ASP
20 June 1968		Gilson Butte	AO-65	X-141 BRD F2/9; FKGrp 22 ASP
19 July 1968		Gilson Butte		X-142 7th Army F3
19 July 1968		Gilson Butte		X-143 7th Army F4
3 August 1968		Gilson Butte	AO-68	X-145 BRD F6; FKGrp 12 ASP
3 August 1968		Gilson Butte	AO-69	X-144 BRD F5; FKGrp 21 ASP
5 November 1968	16:11	Gilson Butte		X-149 7th Army
5 November 1968	18:00	Gilson Butte		X-150 7th Army
13 November 1968		Gilson Butte	AO-72	X-151 BRD GILB-19 operational test; FKGrp 12 ASP
2 April 1969		Black Mesa	AO-73	BRD; FKGrp 21 ASP
2 April 1969		Black Mesa	AO-74	BRD; FKGrp 22 ASP
15 April 1969		Black Mesa		X-152 7th Army F1
16 April 1969		Black Mesa		X-153 7th Army F2
29 April 1969	17:55	Black Mesa	AO-77	X-154 German F3; FKGrp 12 ASP
29 April 1969	19:00	Black Mesa	AO-78	X-155 German F4 (failure); FKGrp 13 ASP
1 May 1969		Black Mesa		X-156 German F5
1 May 1969		Black Mesa		X-157 German F6
14 May 1969	15:30	Black Mesa		X-158 7th Army F7
14 May 1969	16:40	Black Mesa		X-159 7th Army F8
5 September 1969	19:55	Black Mesa	AO-81	X-160 BRD F1; FKGrp 12 ASP
5 September 1969	20:30	Black Mesa	AO-82	X-161 BRD F2; FKGrp 13 ASP
16 April 1970	20:00	Black Mesa	T01/AO-87	X-166 BRD; FKGrp 12 ASP
16 April 1970	20:37	Black Mesa	T02/AO-88	X-167 BRD; FKGrp 12 ASP
1 June 1970		Black Mesa	T08	X-173
4 June 1970	1:10	Black Mesa	T05 4/AO-90	X-170 BRD; FKGrp 13 ASP
4 June 1970	20:00	Black Mesa	T06 5/AO-91	X-171 BRD; FKGrp 13 ASP
5 June 1970	1:00	Black Mesa	T07 6	X-172 7th Army
15 September 1970		Black Mesa	T01	X-178 Fort Sill
17 September 1970	20:00	Black Mesa	T02	X-179 Fort Sill
29 September 1970	19:15	Black Mesa	T03	X-180 7th Army operational test
29 September 1970	19:36	Black Mesa	T04	X-181 7th Army
29 September 1970	21:10	Black Mesa	T05	X-182 7th Army
29 September 1970	21:34	Black Mesa	OffR 117 T06	X-183 7th Army
14 October 1970	3:05	Black Mesa	T07/AO-95	X-184 BRD; FKGrp 21 ASP
14 October 1970	4:15	Black Mesa	T08/AO-96	X-185 BRD (failure); FKGrp 21 ASP
5 November 1970	3:35	Black Mesa	T09	X-186 7th Army
5 November 1970	4:05	Black Mesa	T10	X-187 7th Army
5 November 1970	5:25	Black Mesa	T11	X-188 7th Army (failure)
5 November 1970	7:35	Black Mesa	T12	X-189 7th Army
23 November 1970	20:30	Black Mesa	T13	X-190 7th Army
23 November 1970	23:10	Black Mesa	T14	X-191 7th Army
23 November 1970	23:45	Black Mesa	T15	X-192 7th Army
24 November 1970	0:20	Black Mesa	OffR 127 T16	X-193 7th Army
27 April 1971	18:30	Green River	T01	X-194 7th Army
27 April 1971	19:00	Green River	T02	X-195 7th Army
27 April 1971	20:00	Green River	T03	X-196 7th Army
27 April 1971	20:30	Green River	T04	X-197 7th Army
12 May 1971		Green River	T06	X-199 7th Army
12 May 1971		Green River	T07	X-200 7th Army
12 May 1971		Green River	T08	X-201 7th Army
12 May 1971		Green River	T05	X-198 7th Army
28 May 1971	4:20	Green River	T09	X-202 7th Army
28 May 1971	4:50	Green River	T10	X-203 7th Army
28 May 1971	6:55	Green River	T11	X-204 7th Army
8 June 1971	20:31	Green River	T12	X-205 Fort Sill
18 April 1972	16:00	Green River	T01 Imp	X-212 Fort Sill/ARMTE

=== Pershing 1a ===
Date	Time GMT	Site	ID	Unit/Test
6 March 1968		Fort Bliss		X-138 Martin Marietta
5 August 1968		Gilson Butte		X-147 Fort Sill F8
5 August 1968		Gilson Butte		X-146 Fort Sill F7
7 August 1968		Gilson Butte		X-148 Fort Sill F9
16 September 1969		Black Mesa		X-162 Fort Sill F3
16 September 1969		Black Mesa		X-163 Fort Sill F4
30 September 1969	20:15	Black Mesa		X-164 Fort Sill F5
30 September 1969	23:55	Black Mesa		X-165 Fort Sill F6
1 April 1970		Black Mesa	T04 7	X-169 7th Army
28 April 1970		Black Mesa	T03	X-168 7th Army (failure)
14 July 1970	15:35	Black Mesa	DASO T09	X-174 7th Army
14 July 1970	16:00	Black Mesa	DASO T10	X-175 7th Army
4 August 1970	21:01	Black Mesa	T11	X-176 7th Army
4 August 1970	21:25	Black Mesa	T12	X-177 7th Army
23 September 1971		Fort Bliss: McGregor Range	Imp T01	X-206 Fort Sill (failure)
30 September 1971		Fort Bliss: McGregor Range	Imp T02	X-207 Fort Sill (failure)
22 October 1971		Fort Bliss: McGregor Range	T03	X-208 7th Army
27 October 1971		Fort Bliss: McGregor Range		X-209 7th Army
9 November 1971		Fort Bliss: McGregor Range	OffR 150 T06	X-211 Fort Sill
9 November 1971		Fort Bliss: McGregor Range	T05	X-210 7th Army
18 April 1972	18:40	Green River	T02 Imp	X-213 7th Army/ARMTE
17 May 1972		Green River	T04 Imp	X-215 7th Army/ARMTE
17 May 1972		Green River	T03 Imp	X-214 7th Army/ARMTE
17 May 1972		Green River	T05	X-216 7th Army
17 May 1972		Green River	T06	X-217 7th Army
1 June 1972		Green River	T09	X-220 7th Army
1 June 1972		Green River	T10	X-221 7th Army
2 June 1972	6:10	Green River	T07	X-218 7th Army
2 June 1972	6:45	Green River	T08	X-219 7th Army
7 June 1972		Green River	T11	X-222 7th Army
8 June 1972		Green River	T12	X-223 7th Army
13 June 1972		Green River	T14	X-225 BRD
13 June 1972		Green River	T13	X-224 BRD
22 June 1972	14:20	Green River	T15	X-226 BRD
22 June 1972	15:00	Green River	T16	X-227 BRD
29 June 1972		Green River	T19	X-230 7th Army
29 June 1972		Green River	T20	X-231 7th Army
29 June 1972		Green River	T17	X-228 7th Army
29 June 1972		Green River	T18	X-229 7th Army
18 September 1972		Green River	AO	X-233 BRD F2
18 September 1972		Green River	AO	X-232 BRD F1
25 September 1972	14:30	Green River	AO-114	X-234 BRD F3 German operational test
25 September 1972	15:30	Green River	AO-115	X-235 BRD F4 German operational test
11 October 1972		Green River	AO	X-236 7th Army F5 Ar/Ord
11 October 1972		Green River	AO	X-237 7th Army F6
20 October 1972		Green River		X-238 7th Army F7
20 October 1972		Green River	AO	X-239 Fort Sill F8
21 February 1973	15:05	Cape Canaveral: LC31A	101	X-240 A Btry 3/84 FA operational test launch
21 February 1973	15:37	Cape Canaveral: LC31A	102	X-241 A Btry 3/84 FA operational test launch
21 February 1973	16:30	Cape Canaveral: LC31A	103	X-242 A Btry 3/84 FA operational test launch
21 February 1973	17:06	Cape Canaveral: LC31A	104	X-243 A Btry 3/84 FA operational test launch
6 March 1973	23:28	Cape Canaveral: LC31A	105	X-244 C Btry 1/41 FA operational test launch
6 March 1973	23:48	Cape Canaveral: LC31A	106	X-245 C Btry 1/41 FA operational test launch
7 March 1973	0:22	Cape Canaveral: LC31A	107	X-246 C Btry 1/41 FA operational test launch (failure)
7 March 1973	0:50	Cape Canaveral: LC31A	108	X-247 C Btry 1/41 FA operational test launch
19 March 1973	16:02	Cape Canaveral: LC31A	111	X-248 C Btry 3/84 FA operational test launch
19 March 1973	16:16	Cape Canaveral: LC31A	112	X-249 C Btry 3/84 FA operational test launch
19 March 1973	17:20	Cape Canaveral: LC31A	109	X-250 C Btry 3/84 FA operational test launch
19 March 1973	17:52	Cape Canaveral: LC31A	110	X-251 C Btry 3/84 FA operational test launch
19 June 1973		Fort Bliss: McGregor Range		X-252 Fort Sill F1
19 June 1973		Fort Bliss: McGregor Range		X-253 7th Army F2
27 June 1973		Fort Bliss: McGregor Range		X-254 7th Army F3 operational test
27 June 1973		Fort Bliss: McGregor Range		X-255 7th Army F4 operational test (failure)
17 July 1973	14:53	Fort Bliss: McGregor Range		X-256 BRD F5
17 July 1973	16:19	Fort Bliss: McGregor Range		X-257 BRD F6
26 July 1973		Fort Bliss: McGregor Range		X-259 BRD F8
26 July 1973		Fort Bliss: McGregor Range		X-258 BRD F7 (failure)
25 September 1973	9:30	Green River		P-268 Fort Sill F1
25 September 1973	10:05	Green River		P-269 Fort Sill F2
10 October 1973		Green River		P-270 BRD F3
10 October 1973		Green River		P-271 BRD F4
24 October 1973	10:15	Green River		P-272 BRD F5
24 October 1973	11:05	Green River		P-273 BRD F6
1 November 1973		Green River		P-274 7th Army
1 November 1973		Green River		P-275 7th Army
27 November 1973		Green River		P-276 7th Army F9
27 November 1973		Green River		P-277 7th Army F10
6 December 1973		Green River		P-278 7th Army F11
6 December 1973		Green River	139	P-279 7th Army F12 test
7 May 1974	19:00	Cape Canaveral: LC16	103	P-280 C Btry 1/81 FA operational test launch
7 May 1974	19:15	Cape Canaveral: LC16	104	P-281 C/D Btry 1/81 FA operational test launch
7 May 1974	20:05	Cape Canaveral: LC16	102	P-282 C Btry 1/81 FA operational test launch
7 May 1974	20:21	Cape Canaveral: LC16	101	P-283 C Btry 1/81 FA operational test launch
21 May 1974		Cape Canaveral: LC16	109	P-284 7th Army operational test (failure)
21 May 1974	13:04	Cape Canaveral: LC16	110	P-285 7th Army operational test
21 May 1974	13:18	Cape Canaveral: LC16	111	P-286 7th Army operational test
21 May 1974	14:28	Cape Canaveral: LC16	112	P-287 7th Army operational test
31 May 1974	19:00	Cape Canaveral: LC16	105	P-288 operational test (failure)
31 May 1974	19:15	Cape Canaveral: LC16	106	P-289 operational test
31 May 1974	20:05	Cape Canaveral: LC16	107	P-290 operational test
31 May 1974	20:21	Cape Canaveral: LC16	108	P-291 operational test
17 October 1974	14:10	Fort Bliss: McGregor Range		P-292 Fort Sill
17 October 1974	15:08	Fort Bliss: McGregor Range		P-293 Fort Sill
31 October 1974	15:02	Fort Bliss: McGregor Range		P-294 7th Army
31 October 1974	16:25	Fort Bliss: McGregor Range		P-295 7th Army
25 November 1974		Fort Bliss: McGregor Range		P-297 BRD
25 November 1974		Fort Bliss: McGregor Range		P-296 BRD
6 December 1974		Fort Bliss: McGregor Range		P-298 BRD
6 December 1974		Fort Bliss: McGregor Range		P-299 BRD
13 May 1975	9:00	Green River		P-300 German operational test; 300th Pershing launch; FKW1
13 May 1975	10:00	Green River		P-301 German operational test; FKW1
28 May 1975	9:38	Green River		P-302 German operational test; FKW1
28 May 1975	10:04	Green River		P-303 German operational test; FKW1
11 June 1975	9:22	Green River		P-304 7th Army operational test; Improved Pershing 1a
11 June 1975	10:00	Green River		P-305 7th Army operational test; Improved Pershing 1a
25 June 1975		Green River		P-307 7th Army operational test
25 June 1975		Green River		P-306 7th Army operational test
23 July 1975	15:04	Cape Canaveral: LC16	37	P-308 D Btry 3/84 FA operational test launch
23 July 1975	16:38	Cape Canaveral: LC16	38	P-309 D Btry 3/84 FA operational test launch
23 July 1975	16:53	Cape Canaveral: LC16	39	P-310 S D Btry 3/84 FA operational test launch
24 July 1975	18:49	Cape Canaveral: LC16	40	P-311 D Btry 3/84 FA operational test launch
5 August 1975	16:04	Cape Canaveral: LC16	41	P-312 C Btry 1/81 FA/D operational test launch
5 August 1975	16:20	Cape Canaveral: LC16	42	P-313 C Btry 1/81 FA/D operational test launch (failure)
5 August 1975	18:16	Cape Canaveral: LC16	43	P-314 C Btry 1/81 FA/D operational test launch
5 August 1975	18:32	Cape Canaveral: LC16	44	P-315 C Btry 1/81 FA/D operational test launch
25 August 1975	15:54	Cape Canaveral: LC16	FOT-45	P-316 C Btry 1/41 FA operational test launch (failure)
25 August 1975	17:32	Cape Canaveral: LC16	FOT-46	P-317 C Btry 1/41 FA operational test launch
26 August 1975	18:32	Cape Canaveral: LC16	FOT-47	P-318 C Btry 1/41 FA operational test launch
26 August 1975	18:49	Cape Canaveral: LC16	FOT-48	P-319 C Btry 1/41 FA operational test launch (failure)
7 October 1975		Fort Bliss: McGregor Range		P-321 BRD-2
7 October 1975		Fort Bliss: McGregor Range		P-320 BRD-1
21 October 1975		Fort Bliss: McGregor Range		P-323 BRD-4
21 October 1975		Fort Bliss: McGregor Range		P-322 BRD-3
15 January 1976	10:00	Fort Bliss: McGregor Range		P-324 9FA
15 January 1976	11:00	Fort Bliss: McGregor Range		P-325 9FA
15 January 1976	12:00	Fort Bliss: McGregor Range		P-326 7th Army
15 January 1976	13:55	Fort Bliss: McGregor Range		P-327 7th Army
4 May 1976		Fort Bliss: McGregor Range		P-329 BRD
4 May 1976		Fort Bliss: McGregor Range		P-328 BRD
18 May 1976		Fort Bliss: McGregor Range		P-330 BRD
18 May 1976		Fort Bliss: McGregor Range		P-331 BRD
2 June 1976	15:19	Fort Bliss: McGregor Range		P-332 7th Army
2 June 1976	15:45	Fort Bliss: McGregor Range		P-333 7th Army
29 June 1976	13:03	Fort Wingate		P-334 7th Army
29 June 1976	14:58	Fort Wingate		P-335 7th Army
26 October 1976	18:06	Cape Canaveral: LC16	FOT-49	C Btry 3/84 FA operational test launch
26 October 1976	19:12	Cape Canaveral: LC16	FOT-50	C Btry 3/84 FA operational test launch
26 October 1976	20:21	Cape Canaveral: LC16	FOT-51	C Btry 3/84 FA operational test launch
26 October 1976	20:39	Cape Canaveral: LC16	FOT-52	C Btry 3/84 FA operational test launch
17 February 1977	18:12	Cape Canaveral: LC16		D Btry 3/84 FA operational test launch
2 March 1977	18:28	Cape Canaveral: LC16		B Btry 1/41 FA operational test launch
2 March 1977	18:53	Cape Canaveral: LC16		B Btry 1/41 FA operational test launch (failure)
2 March 1977	20:31	Cape Canaveral: LC16		B Btry 1/41 FA operational test launch
2 March 1977	21:42	Cape Canaveral: LC16		B Btry 1/41 FA operational test launch (failure)
3 May 1977		Fort Bliss: McGregor Range		WS-244/P-336
3 May 1977		Fort Bliss: McGregor Range		WS-245/P-337
17 May 1977		Fort Bliss: McGregor Range		WS-246/P-338
17 May 1977		Fort Bliss: McGregor Range		WS-247/P-339
31 May 1977		Fort Bliss: McGregor Range		P-340
31 May 1977		Fort Bliss: McGregor Range		P-341
14 June 1977		Fort Bliss: McGregor Range		WS-250/P-342
14 June 1977	14:42	Fort Bliss: McGregor Range		P-343
1 November 1977		White Sands		Pershing II R&D operational test (Pershing 1a motors with Pershing II re-entry vehicle)
18 November 1977	15:04	Fort Bliss: McGregor Range		P-344 / WS-252 / P-II R&D operational test / earth penetrator warhead
1 December 1977		White Sands		Pershing II R&D operational test
1 December 1977		White Sands		Pershing II R&D operational test
9 December 1977		Fort Bliss: McGregor Range		P-345 / WS-253 / P-II R&D operational test / earth penetrator warhead
18 May 1978		White Sands		Operational test
13 July 1978	14:37	Cape Canaveral: LC16	FOT-111	D Btry 1/81 FA operational test launch
13 July 1978	16:57	Cape Canaveral: LC16	FOT-112	D Btry 1/81 FA operational test launch
13 July 1978	18:09	Cape Canaveral: LC16	FOT-113	D Btry 1/81 FA operational test launch
25 July 1978	14:30	Cape Canaveral: LC16	FOT-115	A Btry 3/84 FA operational test launch
25 July 1978	14:48	Cape Canaveral: LC16	FOT-114	A Btry 3/84 FA operational test launch
25 July 1978	15:06	Cape Canaveral: LC16	FOT-116	A Btry 3/84 FA operational test launch
25 August 1978	13:06	Cape Canaveral: LC16	FOT-117	C Btry 1/41 FA operational test launch
25 August 1978	13:23	Cape Canaveral: LC16	FOT-118	C Btry 1/41 FA operational test launch
25 August 1978	13:53	Cape Canaveral: LC16	FOT-119	C Btry 1/41 FA operational test launch
22 February 1979	14:43	Cape Canaveral: LC16	FOT-121	Follow-on test launch
22 February 1979	15:00	Cape Canaveral: LC16	FOT-122	Follow-on test launch
22 February 1979	15:19	Cape Canaveral: LC16	FOT-120	Follow-on test launch
25 April 1979	15:03	Cape Canaveral: LC16	FOT-125	Follow-on test launch
25 April 1979	15:17	Cape Canaveral: LC16	FOT-124	Follow-on test launch
25 April 1979	15:40	Cape Canaveral: LC16	FOT-123	Follow-on test launch
9 May 1979	17:00	Cape Canaveral: LC16	FOT-128	Follow-on test launch
9 May 1979	18:29	Cape Canaveral: LC16	FOT-126	Follow-on test launch
9 May 1979	18:50	Cape Canaveral: LC16	FOT-127	Follow-on test launch
12 February 1980	15:51	Cape Canaveral: LC16	FOT-131	Follow-on test launch
12 February 1980	16:27	Cape Canaveral: LC16	FOT-129	Follow-on test launch
23 April 1980	15:04	Cape Canaveral: LC16	FOT-132	Follow-on test launch
23 April 1980	15:22	Cape Canaveral: LC16	FOT-133	Follow-on test launch
23 April 1980	15:39	Cape Canaveral: LC16	FOT-134	Follow-on test launch
23 April 1980	16:05	Cape Canaveral: LC16	FOT-135	Follow-on test launch
7 May 1980	14:40	Cape Canaveral: LC16		Operational test
7 May 1980	14:59	Cape Canaveral: LC16	FOT-136	Follow-on test launch
7 May 1980	15:58	Cape Canaveral: LC16	FOT-137	Follow-on test launch
15 May 1980	14:51	Cape Canaveral: LC16	FOT-138	Follow-on test launch
15 October 1980		White Sands		German operational test
15 October 1980		White Sands		German operational test
15 October 1980		White Sands		German operational test
15 October 1980		White Sands		German operational test
4 February 1981	15:00	Cape Canaveral: LC16	FOT-141	Follow-on test launch
4 February 1981	15:33	Cape Canaveral: LC16	FOT-139	Follow-on test launch
4 February 1981	15:53	Cape Canaveral: LC16	FOT-140	Follow-on Test launch
17 February 1981	17:15	Cape Canaveral: LC16	FOT-143	Follow-on test launch
17 February 1981	17:51	Cape Canaveral: LC16	FOT-142	Follow-on test launch
17 February 1981	19:17	Cape Canaveral: LC16	FOT-144	Follow-on test launch
7 April 1981	14:00	Cape Canaveral: LC16	FOT-146	Follow-on test launch
7 April 1981	14:19	Cape Canaveral: LC16	FOT-147	Follow-on test launch
7 April 1981	14:40	Cape Canaveral: LC16	FOT-148	Follow-on test launch
21 October 1981		Fort Bliss: McGregor Range		AO-212 test
20 January 1982	14:59	Cape Canaveral: LC16		Operational test
20 January 1982	15:19	Cape Canaveral: LC16		Operational test
20 January 1982	19:06	Cape Canaveral: LC16		Operational test
24 February 1982	14:04	Cape Canaveral: LC16		Operational test
24 February 1982	14:55	Cape Canaveral: LC16		Operational test
24 February 1982	15:14	Cape Canaveral: LC16		Operational test
10 March 1982	15:01	Cape Canaveral: LC16		Operational test
10 March 1982	15:17	Cape Canaveral: LC16		Operational test
10 March 1982	16:26	Cape Canaveral: LC16		Operational test
23 September 1983	12:05	Cape Canaveral: LC16		Operational test
23 September 1983	13:21	Cape Canaveral: LC16		Operational test
23 September 1983	14:34	Cape Canaveral: LC16		Operational test
23 September 1983	14:55	Cape Canaveral: LC16		Operational test
23 September 1983	16:17	Cape Canaveral: LC16		Operational test
13 October 1983	16:25	Cape Canaveral: LC16		Operational test
13 October 1983	16:50	Cape Canaveral: LC16		Operational test
13 October 1983	17:13	Cape Canaveral: LC16		Operational test
13 October 1983	17:43	Cape Canaveral: LC16		Operational test

=== Pershing II ===
The first Pershing II launches were in 1977 using the original design configuration with the Pershing 1a motors and a new re-entry vehicle. The 1979 decision to increase the Pershing range necessitated the development of new motors.

Date	Time GMT	Site	ID	Unit/Test
22 July 1982	14:49	Cape Canaveral: LC16	1	Test mission (failure)
19 November 1982		Fort Bliss: McGregor Range	2	Test mission
21 January 1983	14:48	Cape Canaveral: LC16	3	Test mission
1 February 1983		Fort Bliss: McGregor Range	5	Test mission (single stage)
9 February 1983	15:06	Cape Canaveral: LC16	4	Test mission
13 March 1983	16:29	Fort Bliss: McGregor Range	6	ED-4 (single stage)
28 March 1983	15:29	Cape Canaveral: LC16	7	Test mission
10 April 1983	19:55	Cape Canaveral: LC16		Test mission
24 April 1983		Fort Bliss: McGregor Range	9	Test mission
6 May 1983		Fort Bliss: McGregor Range		Test mission (single stage)
27 May 1983	14:48	Cape Canaveral: LC16		Test mission
2 June 1983	14:46	Cape Canaveral: LC16		Test mission
19 June 1983	16:12	Launch Site: White Sands		Test mission (single stage)
24 June 1983		Fort Bliss: McGregor Range		Test mission (single stage)
16 July 1983		Fort Bliss: McGregor Range		Test mission (single stage)
27 July 1983	14:15	Cape Canaveral: LC16		Test mission (failure)
7 September 1983	17:04	Cape Canaveral: LC16		Test mission
18 September 1983		Fort Bliss: McGregor Range		Test mission (single stage)
16 May 1984	14:31	Cape Canaveral: LC16		Operational test
7 August 1984	12:00	Cape Canaveral: LC16		Operational test
20 September 1984	14:30	Cape Canaveral: LC16		Operational test
3 October 1984	14:22	Cape Canaveral: LC16		Operational test
16 December 1985	13:03	Cape Canaveral: LC16		Operational test
17 December 1985	16:02	Cape Canaveral: LC16		Operational test
17 December 1985	21:37	Cape Canaveral: LC16		Operational test
24 June 1986	13:56	Cape Canaveral: LC16		Operational test
24 June 1986	15:23	Cape Canaveral: LC16		Operational test
24 June 1986	16:33	Cape Canaveral: LC16		Operational test
26 June 1986	13:05	Cape Canaveral: LC16		Operational test
26 June 1986	16:47	Cape Canaveral: LC16		Operational test
24 March 1987	13:33	Cape Canaveral: LC16		Operational test
24 March 1987	13:52	Cape Canaveral: LC16		Operational test
24 March 1987	14:13	Cape Canaveral: LC16		Operational test
24 March 1987	15:34	Cape Canaveral: LC16		Operational test
24 March 1987	15:54	Cape Canaveral: LC16		Operational test
24 March 1987	16:17	Cape Canaveral: LC16		Operational test
21 May 1987	2:00	Cape Canaveral: LC16		Operational test
21 May 1987	2:19	Cape Canaveral: LC16		Operational test
21 May 1987	2:40	Cape Canaveral: LC16		Operational test
21 May 1987	4:00	Cape Canaveral: LC16		Operational test
21 May 1987	4:33	Cape Canaveral: LC16		Operational test
21 May 1987	4:51	Cape Canaveral: LC16		Operational test
27 July 1987	12:38	Cape Canaveral: LC16		Operational test
27 July 1987	12:57	Cape Canaveral: LC16		Operational test
27 July 1987	15:20	Cape Canaveral: LC16		Operational test
27 July 1987	15:37	Cape Canaveral: LC16		Operational test
13 January 1988	14:01	Cape Canaveral: LC16		Operational test
15 February 1988	13:03	Cape Canaveral: LC16		Operational test
15 February 1988	13:21	Cape Canaveral: LC16		Operational test
15 February 1988	13:42	Cape Canaveral: LC16		Operational test
15 February 1988	15:16	Cape Canaveral: LC16		Operational test
15 February 1988	15:42	Cape Canaveral: LC16		Operational test
15 February 1988	16:01	Cape Canaveral: LC16		Operational test
21 March 1988	13:01	Cape Canaveral: LC16		Operational test
21 March 1988	13:19	Cape Canaveral: LC16		Operational test
21 March 1988	14:13	Cape Canaveral: LC16		Operational test
21 March 1988	15:45	Cape Canaveral: LC16		Operational test
21 March 1988	16:53	Cape Canaveral: LC16		Operational test

== Gallery ==
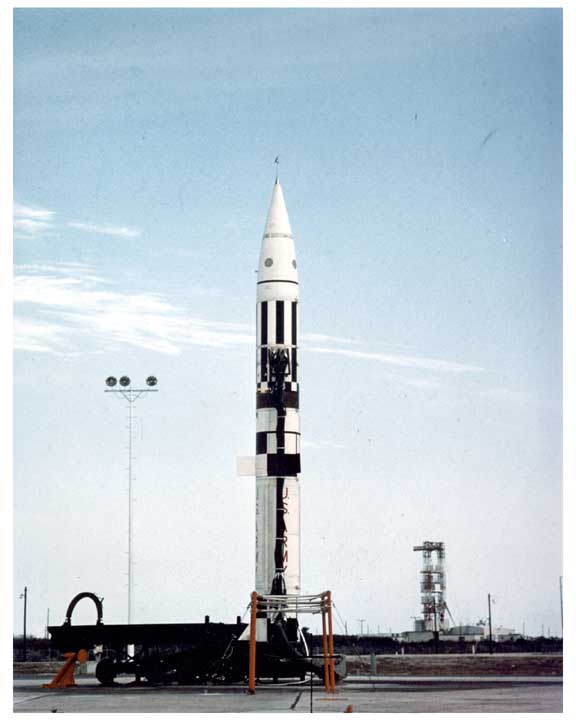
Pershing 1 No. 105, P-01 First test launch, Canaveral LC30A (25 February 1960)

Pershing 1, Canaveral LC30A (25 January 1961)

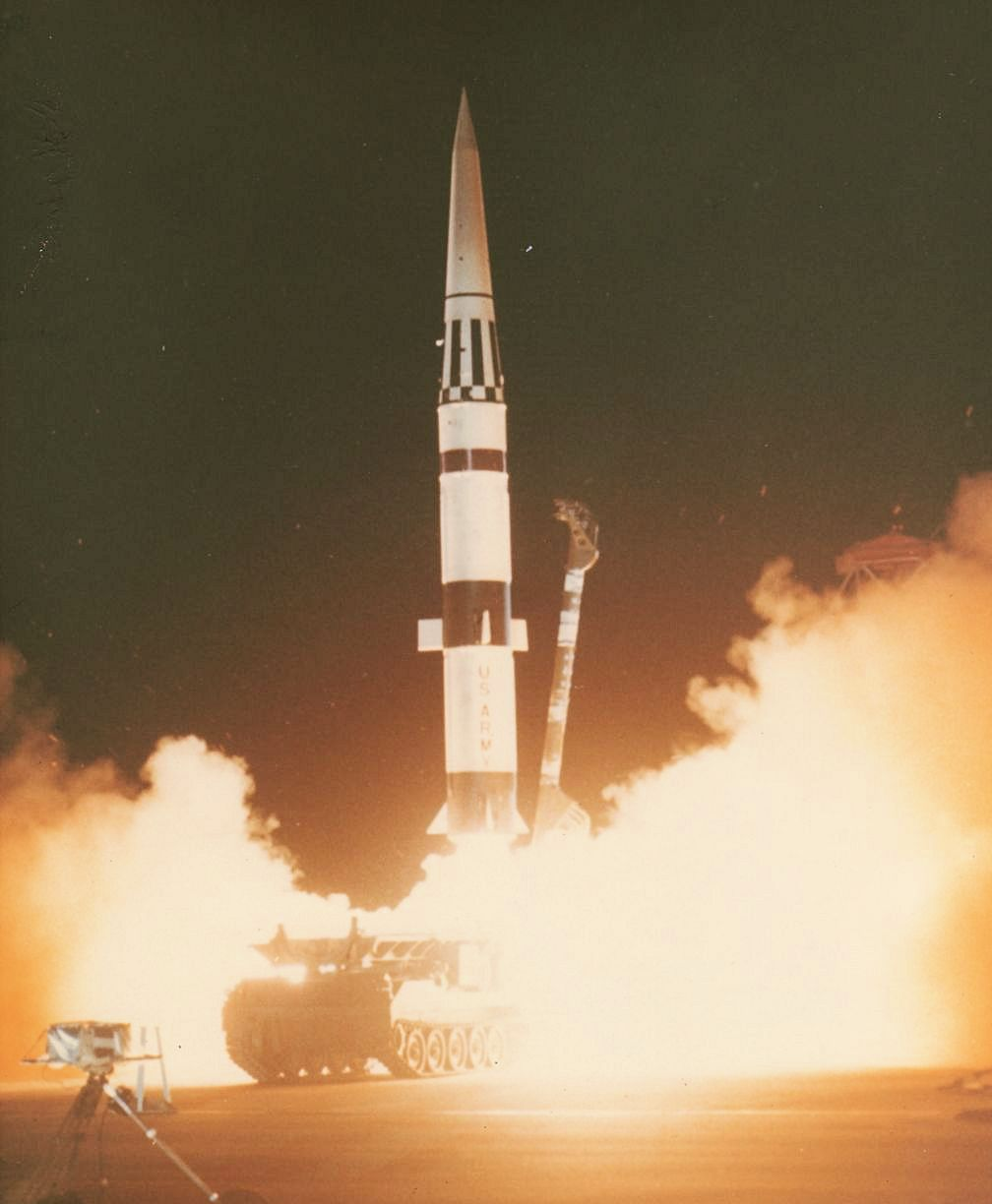
Pershing 1 No. 323, P-26 test, Canaveral LC30A (15 November 1961)

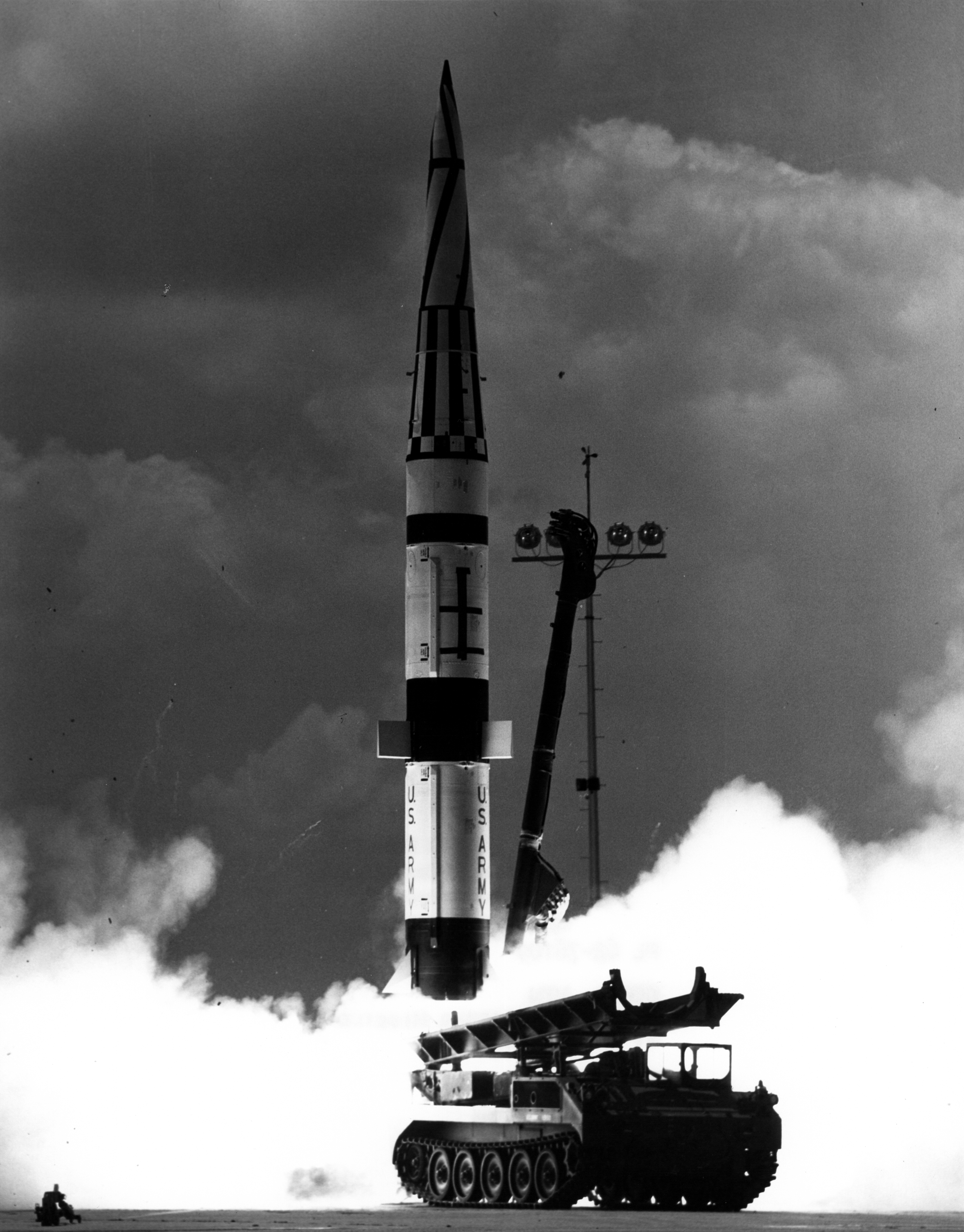
Pershing 1 No. 329, P-35 test, Canaveral LC30A (27 April 1962)

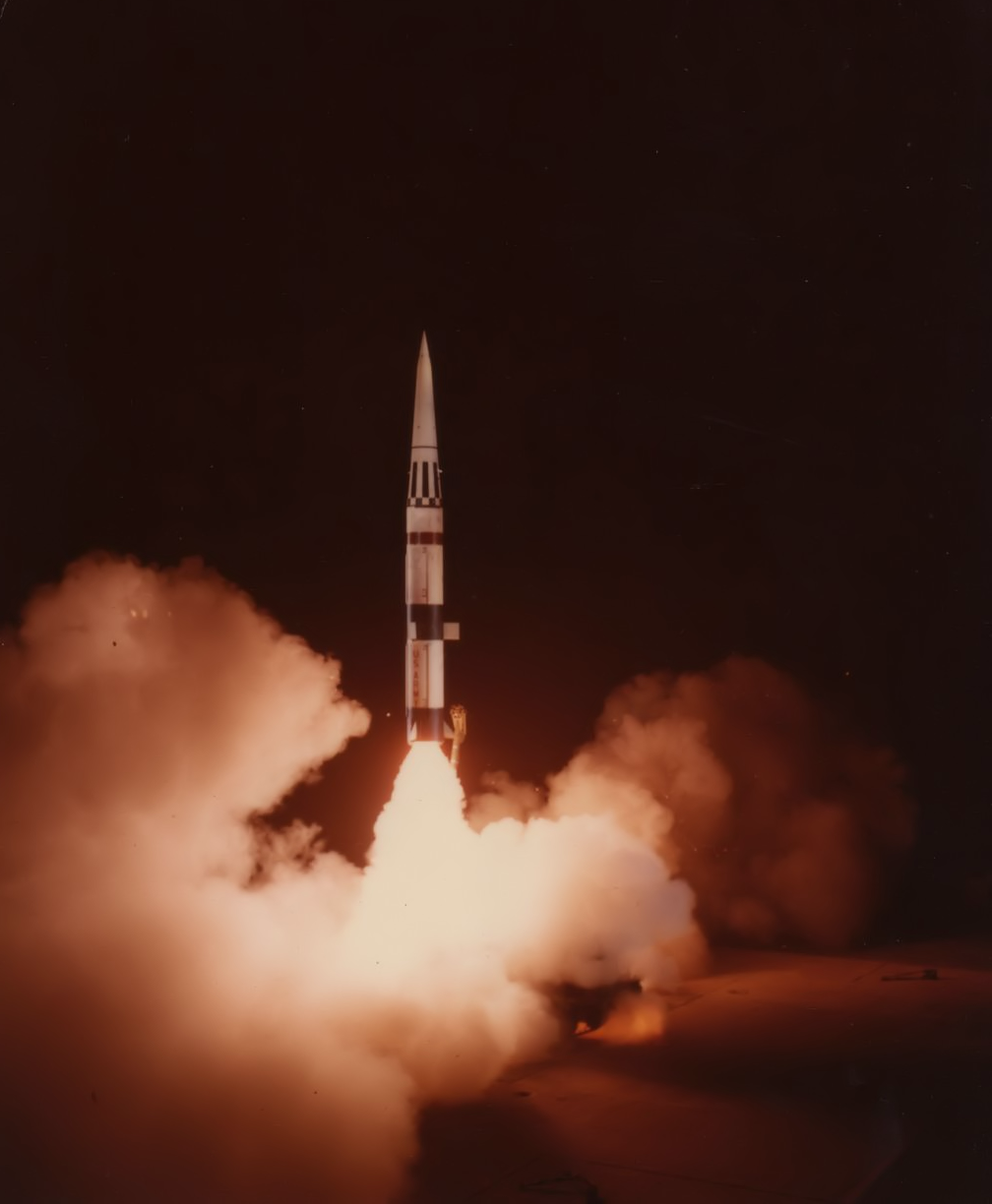
Pershing 1 No. 339, P-37 test, Canaveral LC30A (5 June 1962)

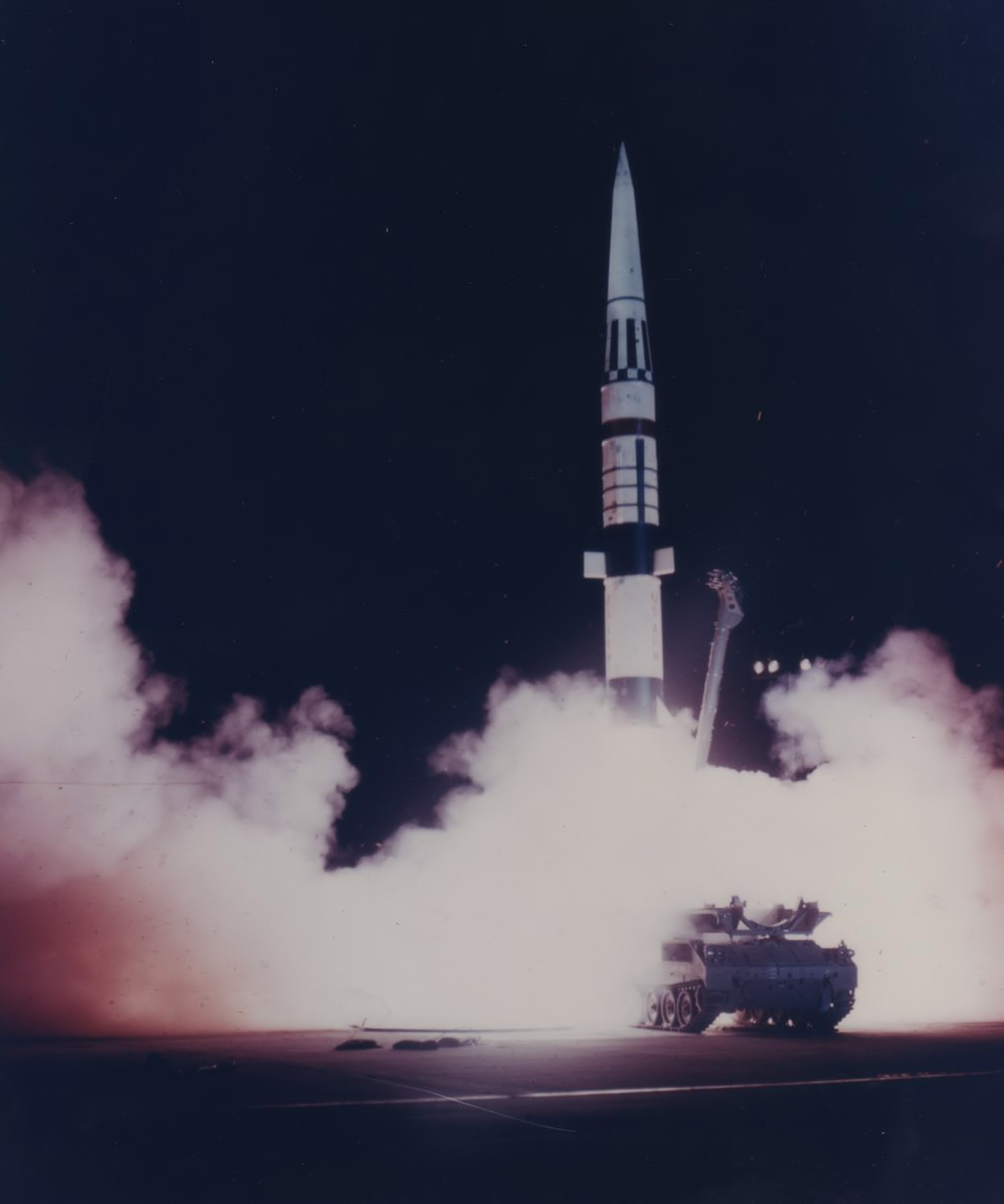
Pershing 1 No. 338, P-39 test, Canaveral LC30A (21 August 1962)

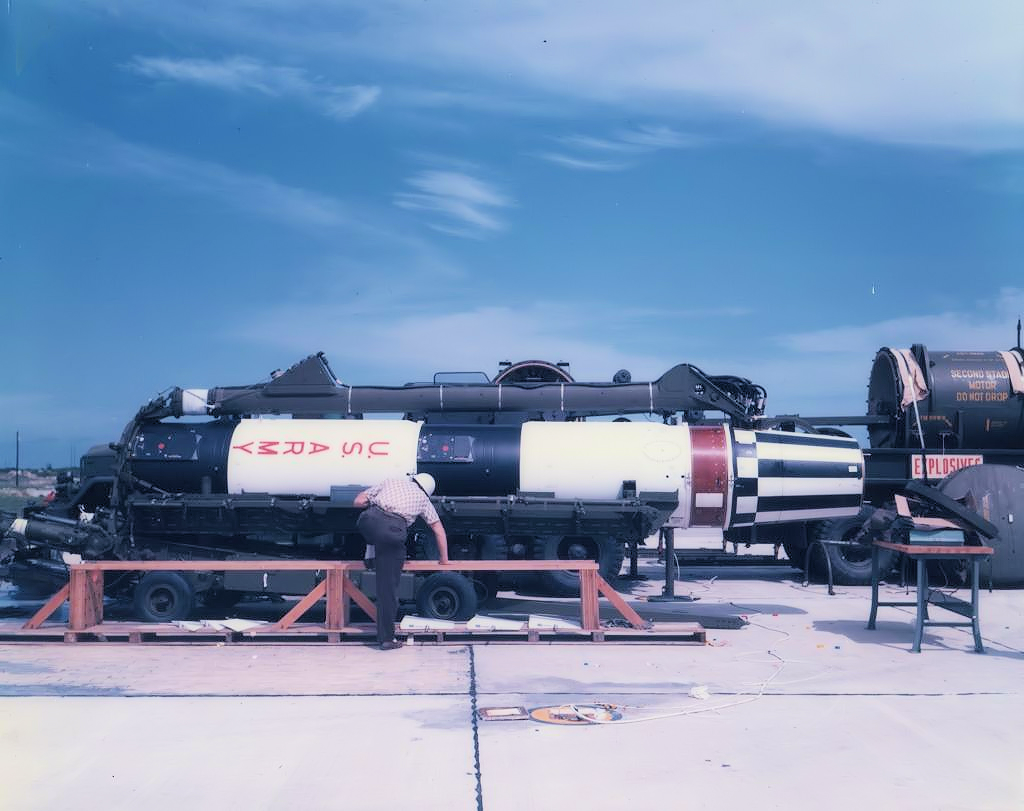
Pershing 1 No. 347, P-40 test, Canaveral LC30 (26 September 1962)

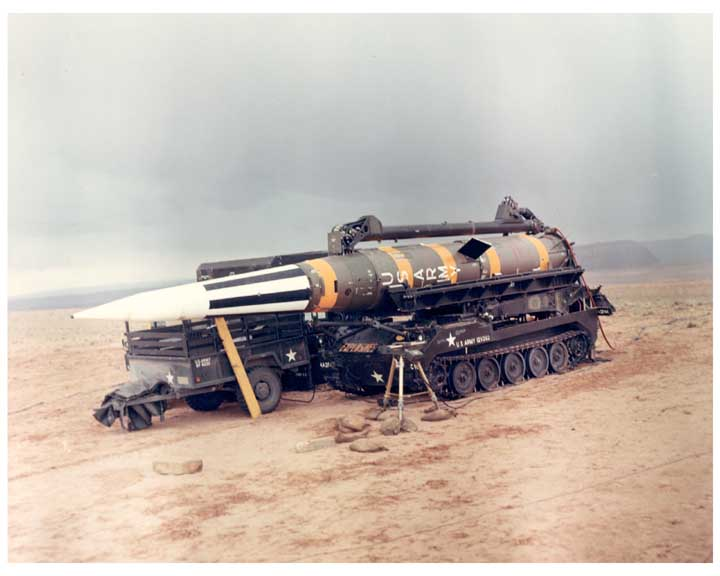
Pershing I, X-92 Fort Sill Operational test Gilson (16 June 1965)

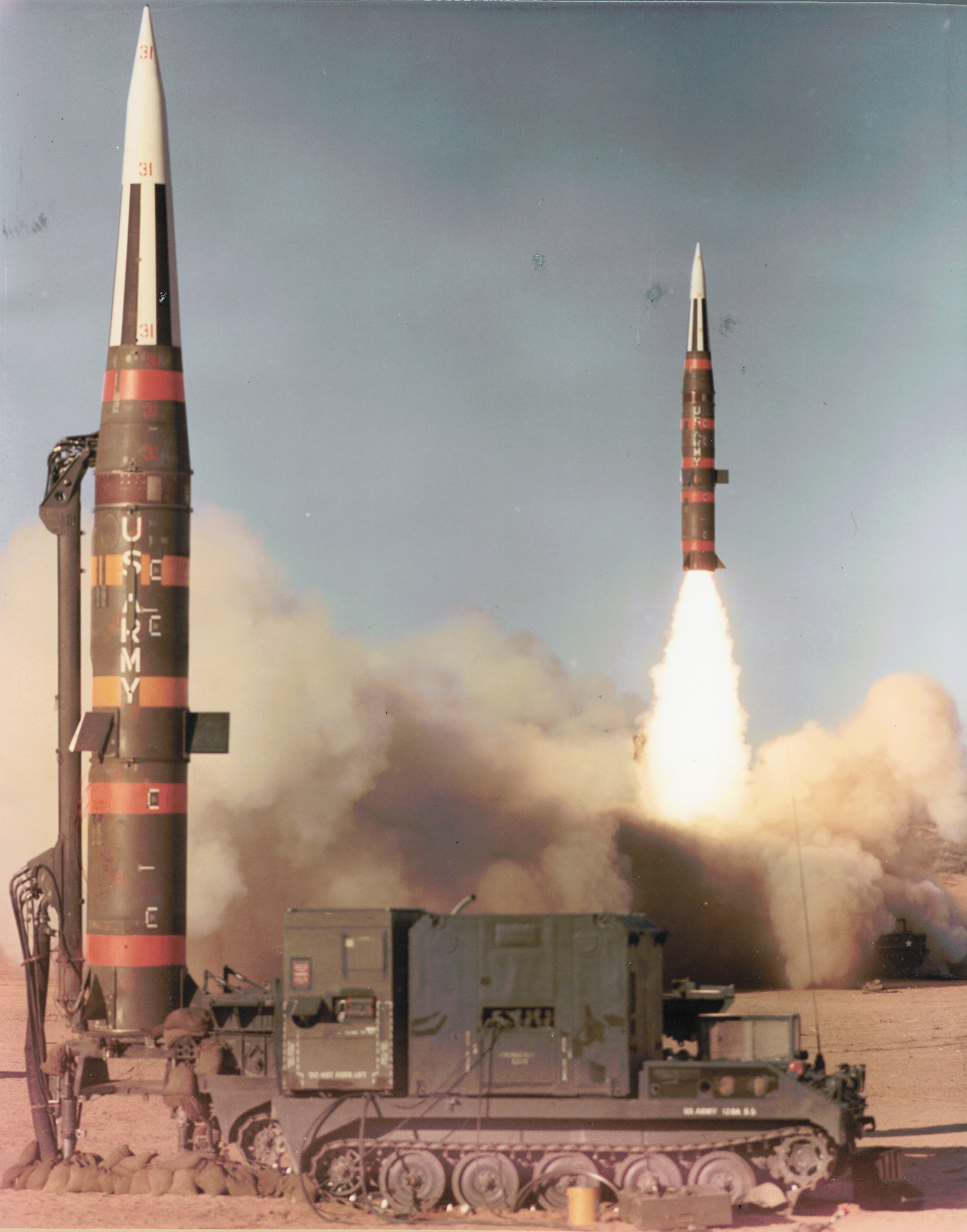
Pershing I, ARTY/ORD 32, Hueco (16 February 1966)

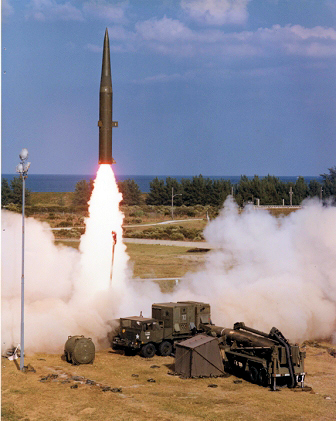
Pershing 1a, Canaveral LC16, C Btry 3/84 FA operational test launch (26 October 1976)

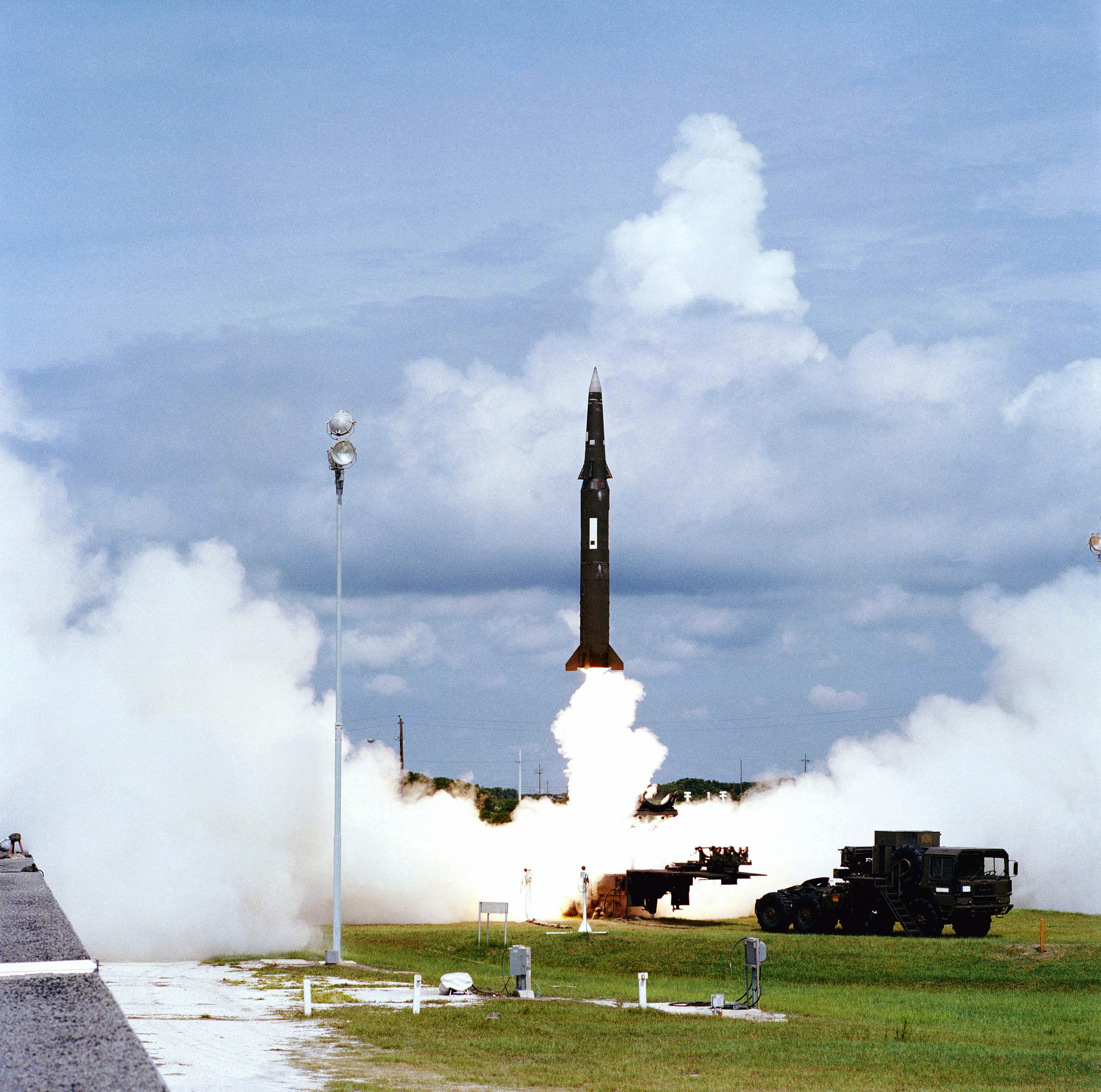
Pershing II, Canaveral LC16 (22 July 1982)

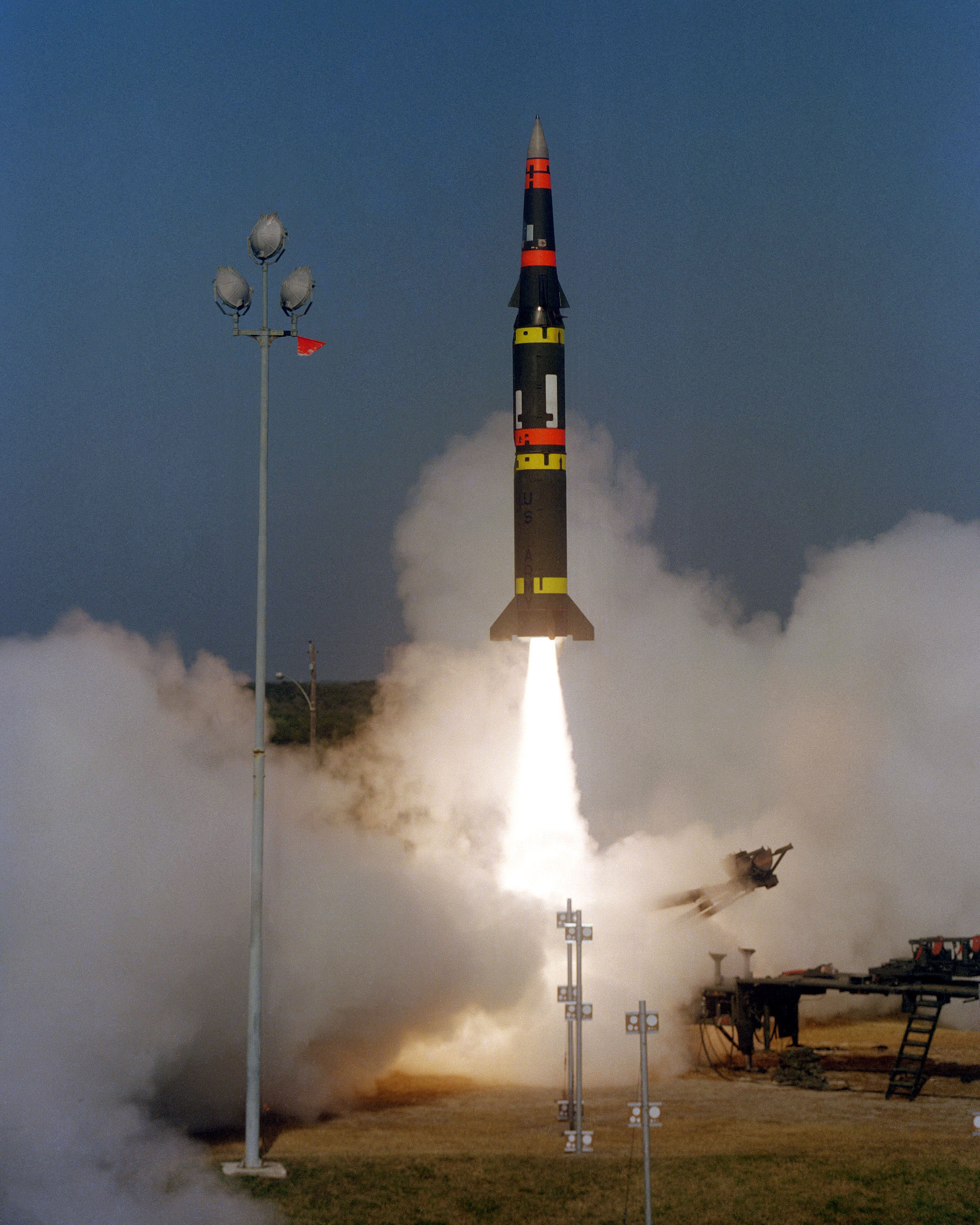
Pershing II, Canaveral LC16 (9 February 1983)

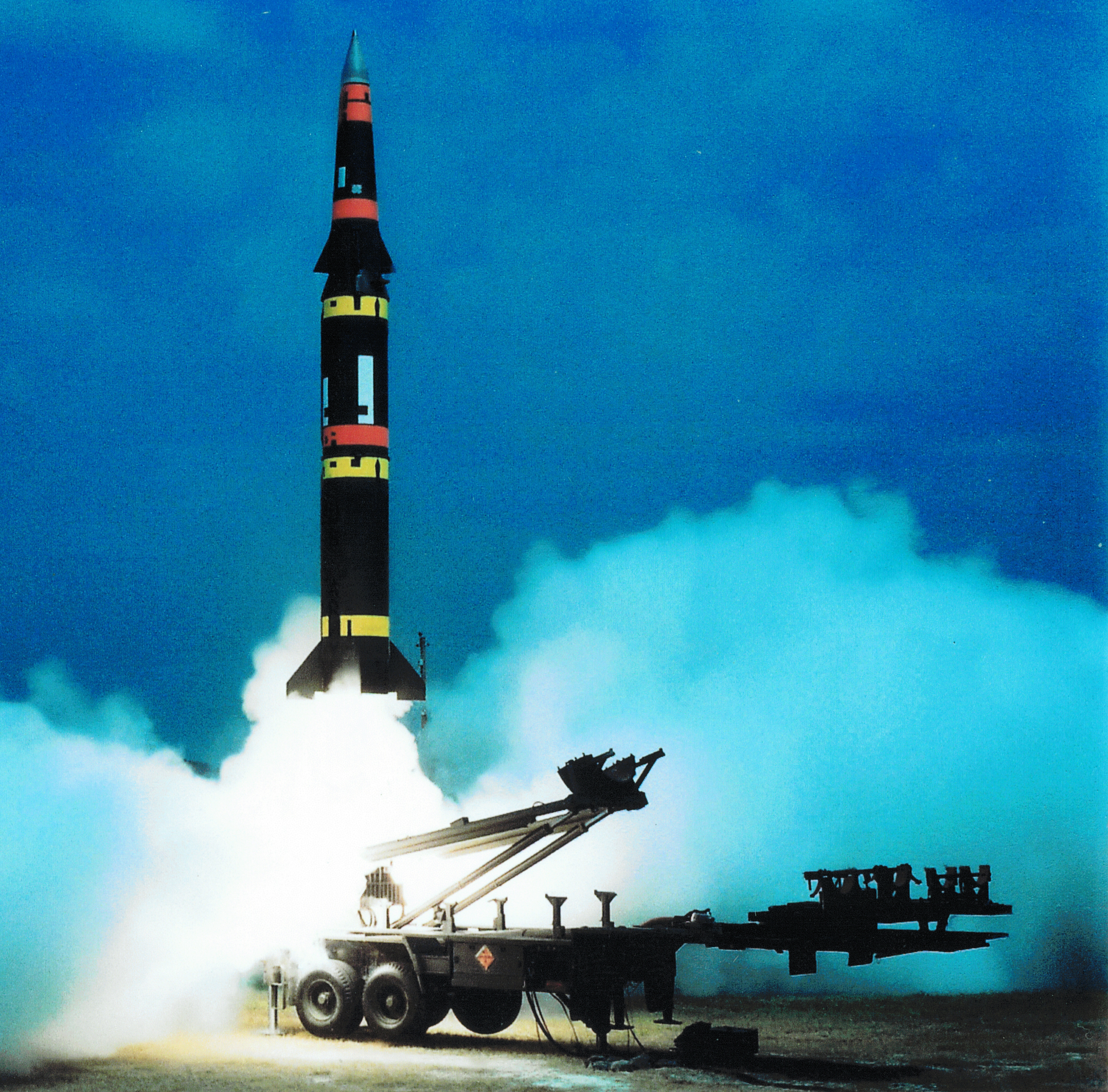
Pershing II, Canaveral LC16 (2 June 1983)

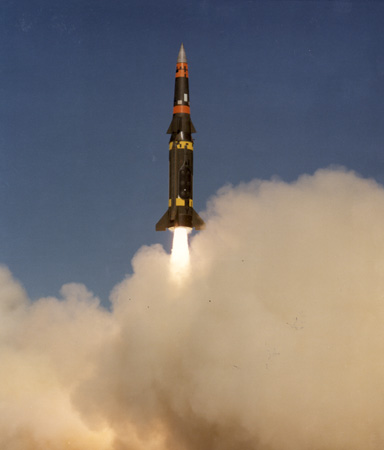
Pershing II, ED-4 single-stage, McGregor Range, Fort Bliss, Texas (13 March 1983)
