= W86 =

W86 nuclear warhead
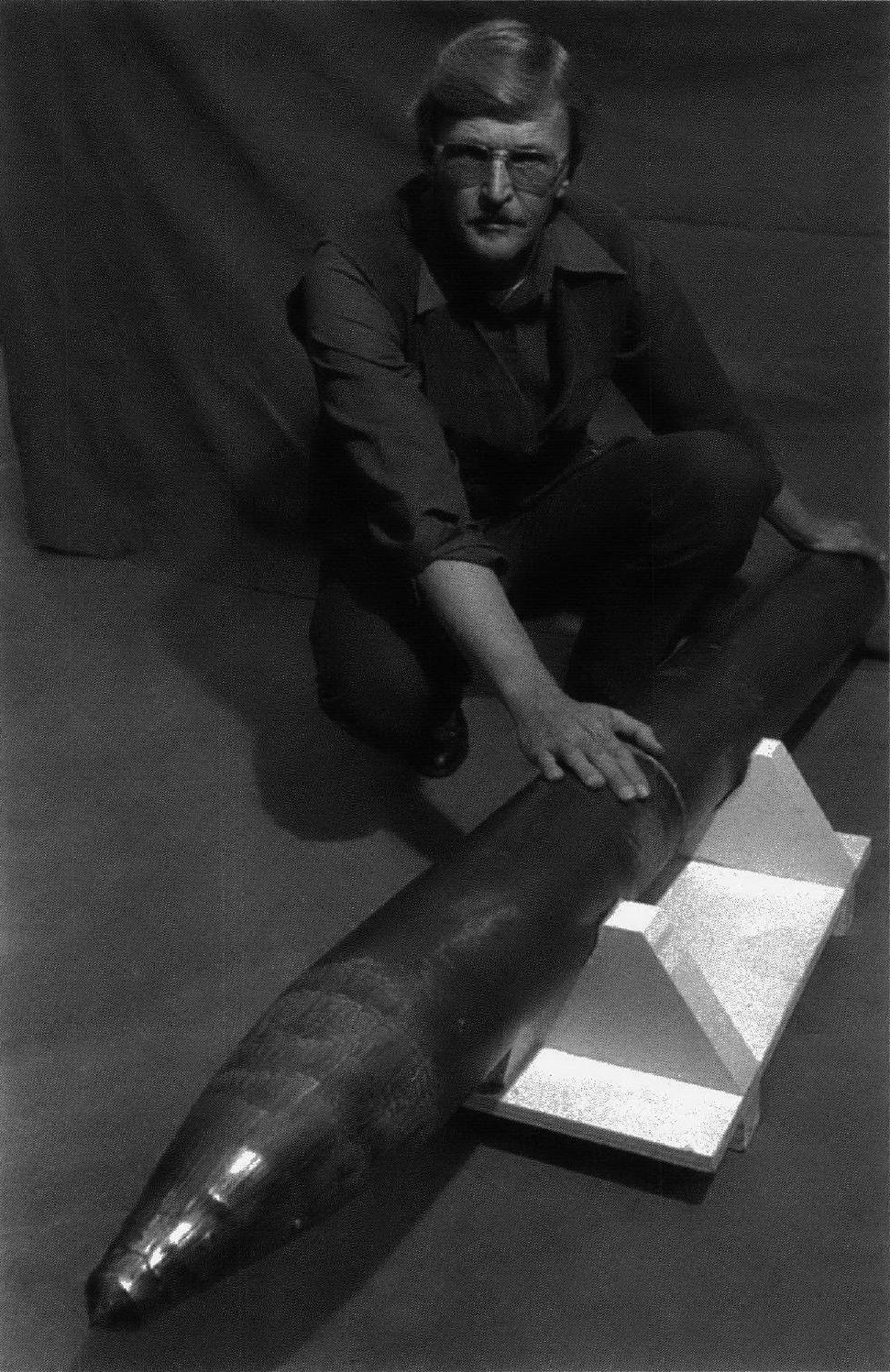
- W86 warhead casing after drop testing
- Type: Nuclear weapon
- Place of origin: United States

Production history
- Designer: Los Alamos National Laboratory
- Designed: 1975 to 1980
- Produced: n/a

Specifications
- Mass: 184 kg (406 lb)
- Diameter: 170 mm (6.7 in)
- Blast yield: Publicly estimated to be 5 or 10 kilotonnes of TNT (21 or 42 TJ)

The W86 was an American earth-penetrating ("bunker buster") nuclear warhead, intended for use on the Pershing II intermediate-range ballistic missile (IRBM). The W86 design was canceled in September 1980 when the Pershing II missile mission shifted from destroying hardened targets to targeting soft targets at greater range. The W85 warhead, which had been developed in parallel with the W86, was used for all production Pershing II missiles.

Development work for the W86's penetrator case began in 1975 at Sandia National Laboratories. The weapon was intended to allow for the destruction of hardened structures and the cratering of runways while using smaller yields.

== Design ==
The warhead was developed from Los Alamos nuclear artillery shell technologies.

A 2005 study by the National Research Council that examined a number of nuclear earth penetrating weapon proposals, described the W86 as being 170 millimetres (6.7 in) in diameter and weighing 184 kilograms (406 lb). The study calculated that such an EPW could penetrate 7.2 metres (24 ft) into medium strength rock, 18.7 metres (61 ft) into low strength rock and 115 metres (377 ft) into silt or clay, assuming a peak allowable deceleration of 10,000 g (98,000 m/s^{2}). The study cites the classified Sandia development report for the W86 warhead for its figures.

In the National Research Council study, they refer to the "low-yield weapon" (W86) as having a yield of less than 5 kilotonnes of TNT (21 TJ) or less than 10 kilotonnes of TNT (42 TJ).

A 1979 article in Sandia's monthly Lab News magazine describes a 400-pound (180 kg) test unit penetrating 67.5 feet (20.6 m) into the Tonopah Test Range lake bed, striking the ground at 1,796 feet per second (547 m/s). Development called for approximately 20 tests of the penetrator into various mediums.

The weapon was an implosion-type weapon.

== Gallery ==
W86 warhead
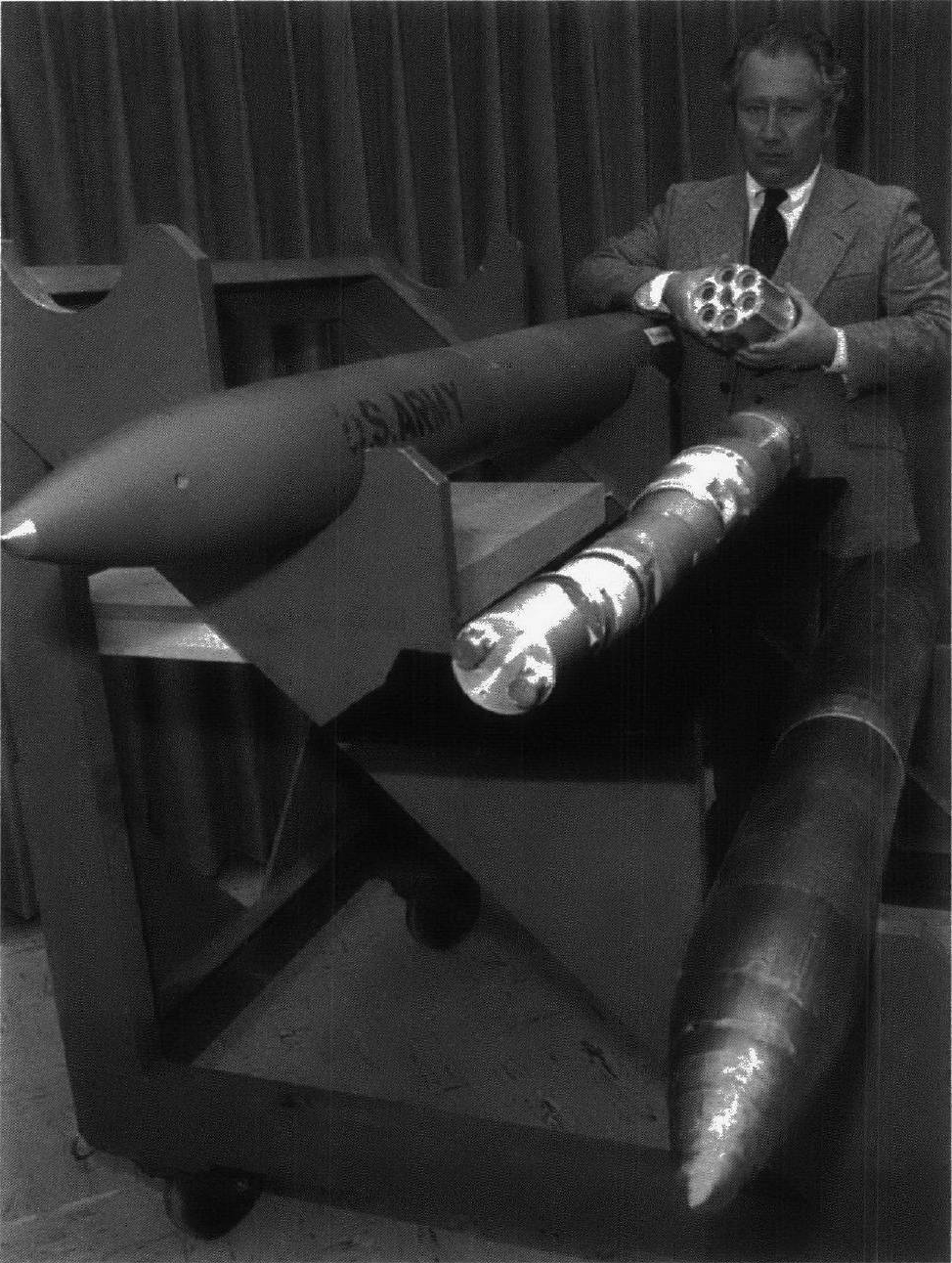
W86 warhead casing before and after a drop test

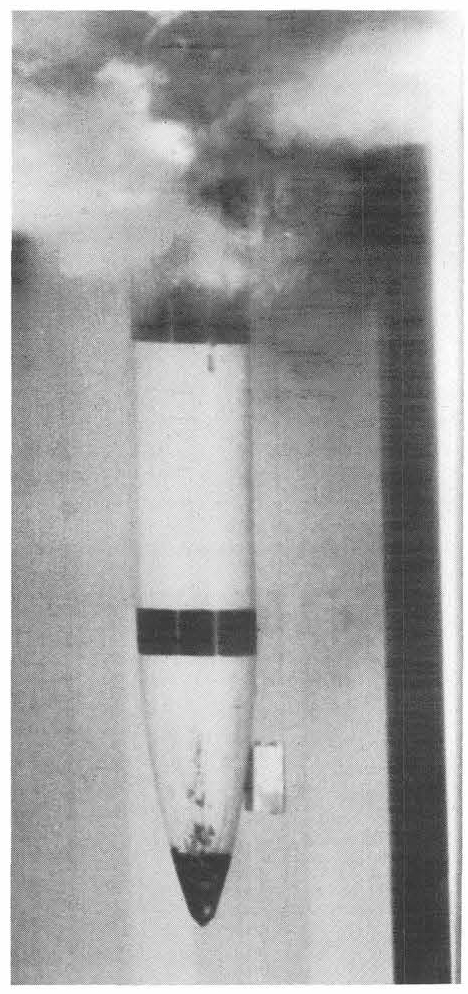
High speed image of the Pershing II penetrator as it left muzzle of a gun used for penetration testing. Velocity was 1,795 feet per second (547 m/s) at this point

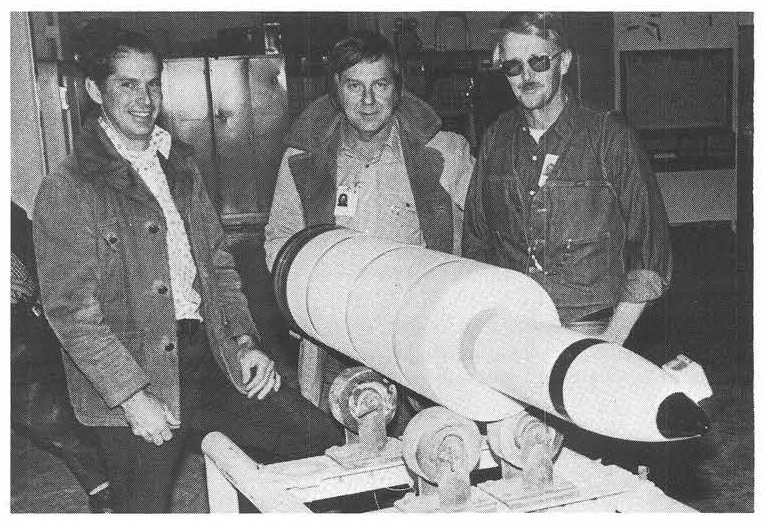
Pershing II penetrator test unit is ready for firing.

== See also ==
- List of nuclear weapons
- B61 nuclear bomb
- Pershing II
