= W85 =

W85 may refer to:

- W85 (nuclear warhead)
- Nonconvex great rhombicuboctahedron
- W85 heavy machine gun
- W85, a classification in masters athletics
