= Pershing missile displays =

There are a number of Pershing missile displays of inert missiles in the U.S., Germany and Russia. The Pershing systems were eliminated after the ratification of the Intermediate-Range Nuclear Forces Treaty on 27 May 1988. The treaty allowed for a total of fifteen Pershing II and GLCM missiles for display and seven Pershing IIs were retained. A number of Pershing 1 and Pershing 1a missiles are also on display.

== Current displays ==
=== Redstone Arsenal ===
Redstone Arsenal, Alabama played an important role in the development, fielding and management of Pershing. The United States Army Missile Command managed the system and Ordnance officers, warrant officers and enlisted technicians were trained at the United States Army Ordnance Missile and Munitions Center and School.

A Pershing 1 missile was originally located in front of Newhall Hall near Gate 10 until 2010. It is now located at Pershing Park on Honest John Road and is mounted on a pedestal. The plaque with a launch photo originally had a photo of a PGM-11 Redstone launch; this has been corrected but the date of 1977 should be 1982. A Pershing 1a and a Pershing II that were once on display at the U.S. Space & Rocket Center are in storage on the arsenal in warehouse building 8021.

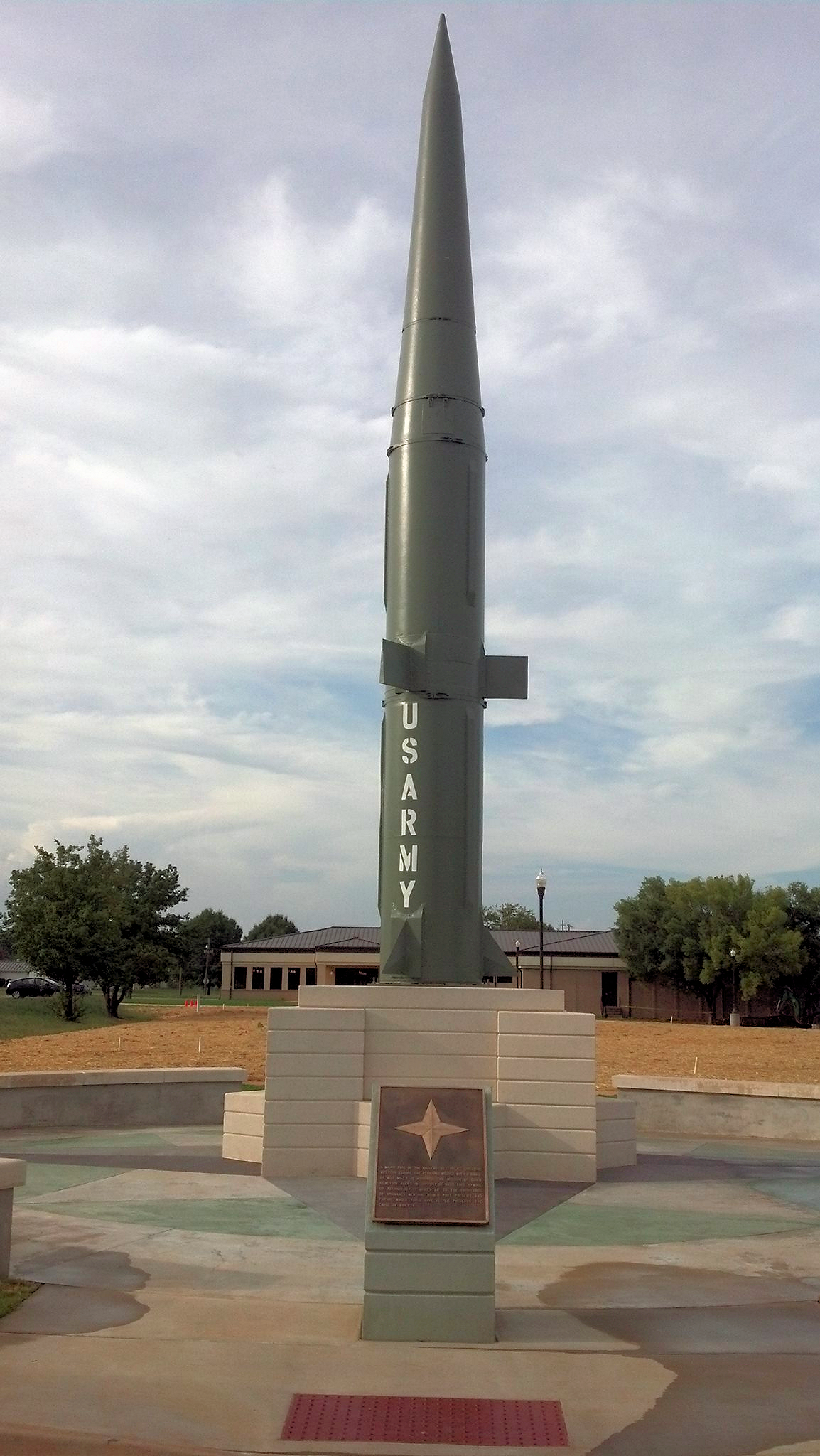
Pershing 1

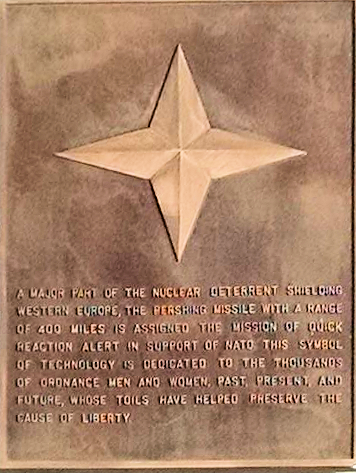
Dedication plaque

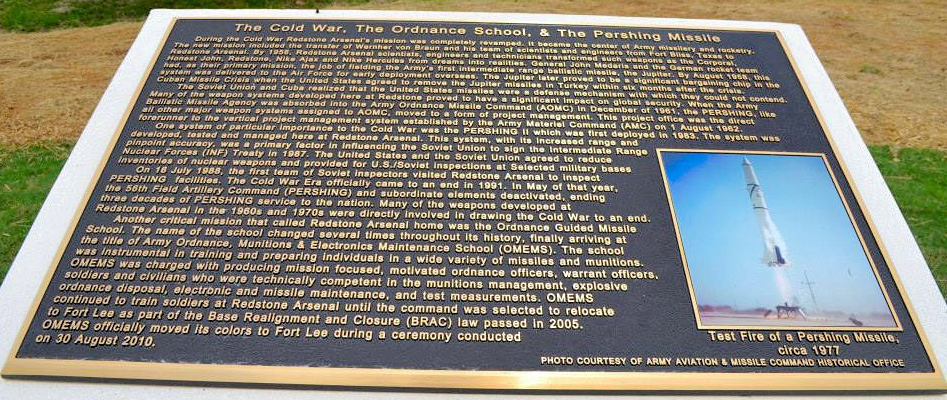
Description plaque

=== Pueblo Chemical Depot ===
Major repairs on Pershing components were performed at Pueblo Depot Activity (PUDA), Colorado. Motor and other testing for Pershing II took place in 1983. A Pershing 1 missile on the M3 erector launcher is in front of the depot headquarters and a Pershing 1 on a fabricated cradle is on display at Hi-PADner Park.

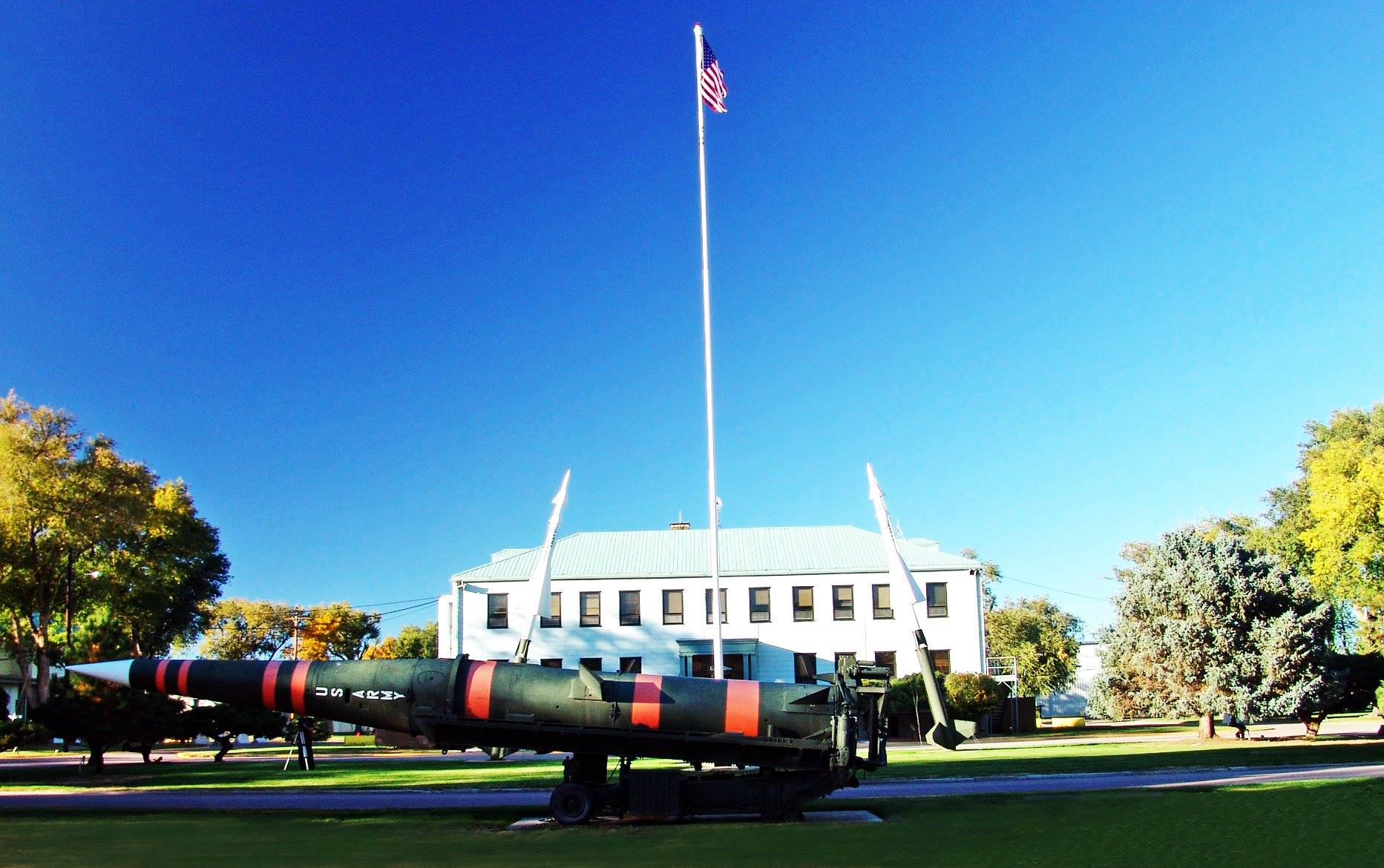
Pershing 1 at Headquarters

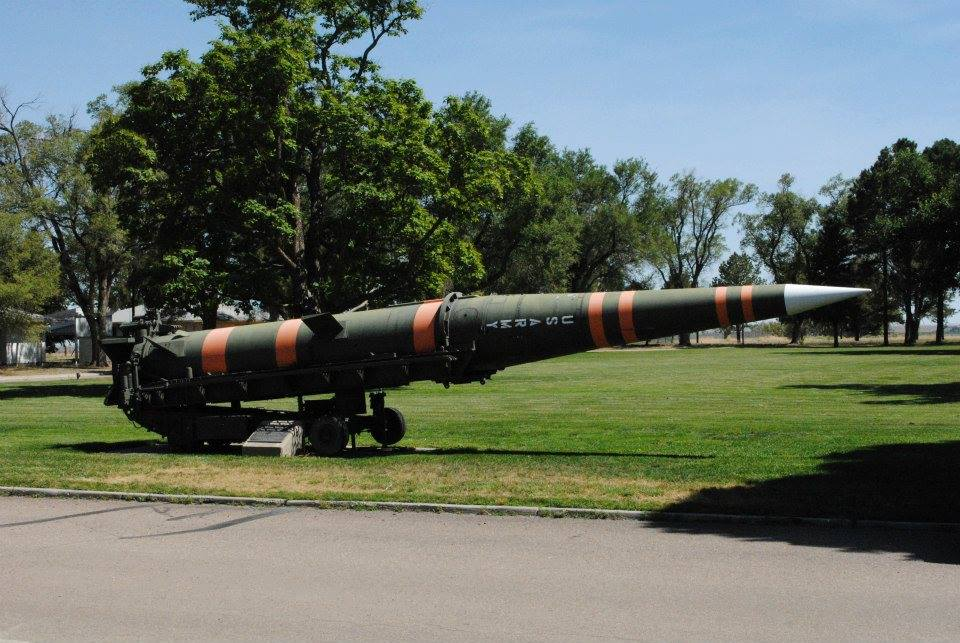
Pershing 1 at Headquarters

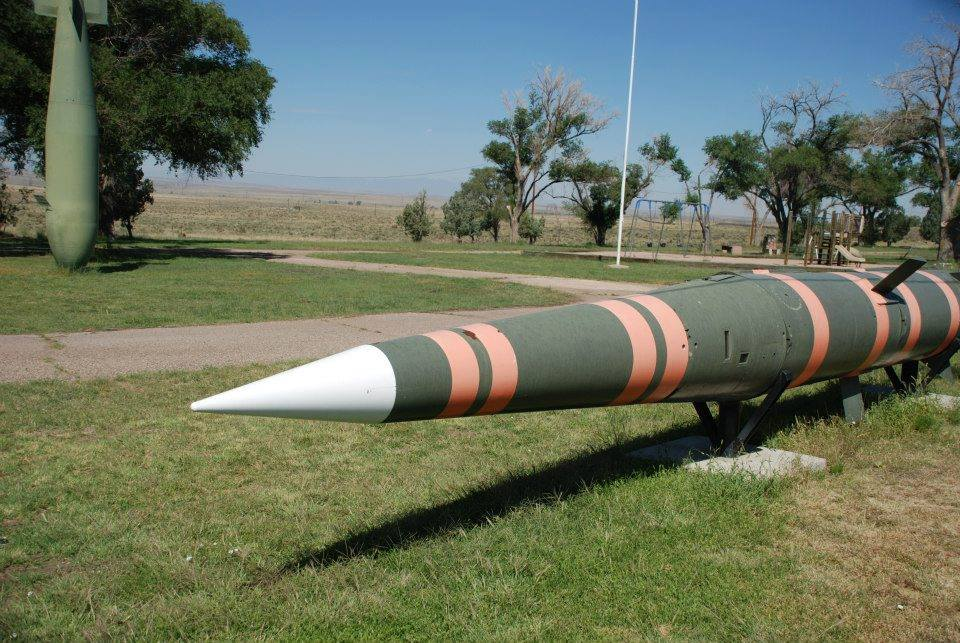
Pershing 1 at Hi-PADner Park

=== Pueblo Weisbrod Aircraft Museum ===
Pueblo Weisbrod Aircraft Museum has a Pershing 1 missile in outside storage with the intent to refurbish it and put it on display.

=== Cape Canaveral Space Force Station ===
Test launches of the Pershing were performed at what is now Cape Canaveral Space Force Station, Florida. The Air Force Space and Missile Museum had a Pershing II on an erector launcher in an outside display. The missile and launcher were refurbished in 2020 and placed on display inside Hangar C. The History Center has a Pershing 1 warhead and guidance and control section that was removed from a missile that was on display in the Rocket Garden and damaged in a hurricane.

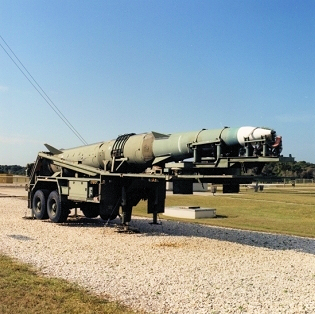
Pershing II in an outside location

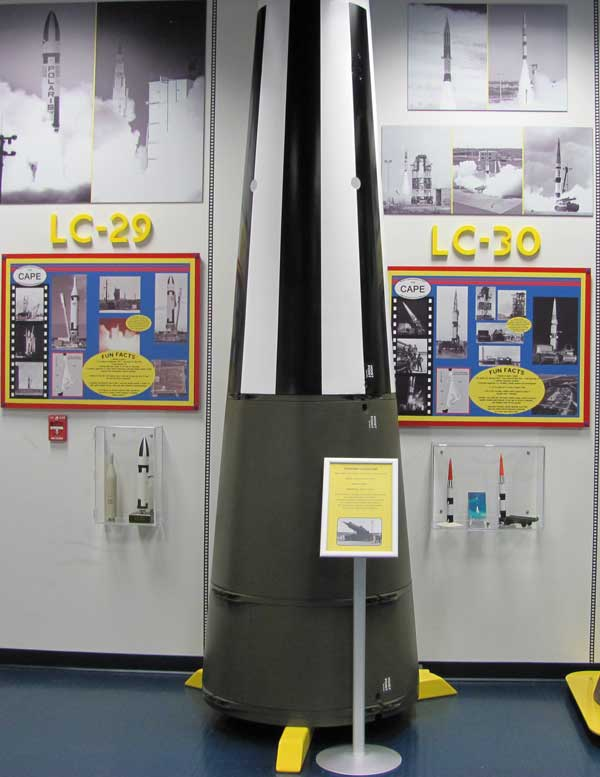
Pershing 1

=== White Sands Missile Range ===
Test launches of the Pershing were also performed at White Sands Missile Range, New Mexico. The White Sands Missile Range Museum has a Pershing II on an erector launcher and a Pershing 1 in the outdoor display.

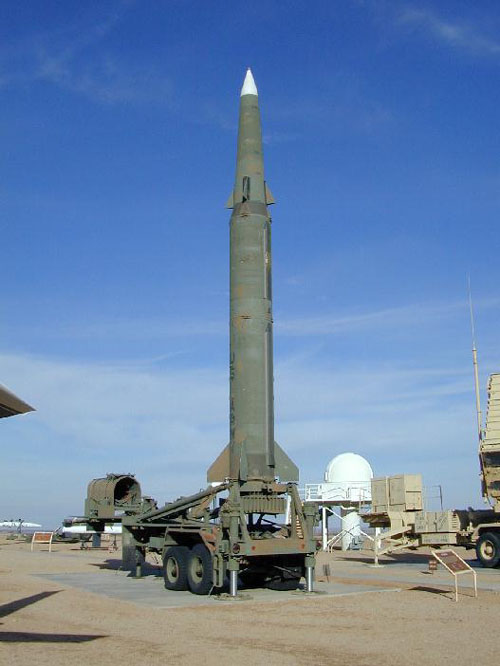
Pershing II

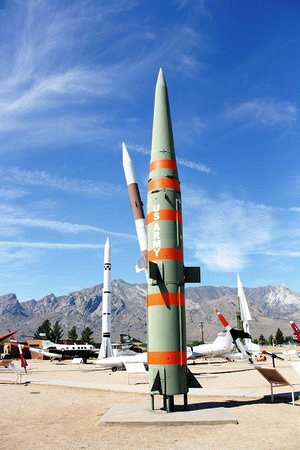
Pershing 1

=== Fort Sill ===
The United States Army Field Artillery School is located at Fort Sill, Oklahoma. The school trained Field Artillery officers and enlisted crewmembers for Pershing. The United States Army Artillery Museum has all three types of Pershing on their launcher.

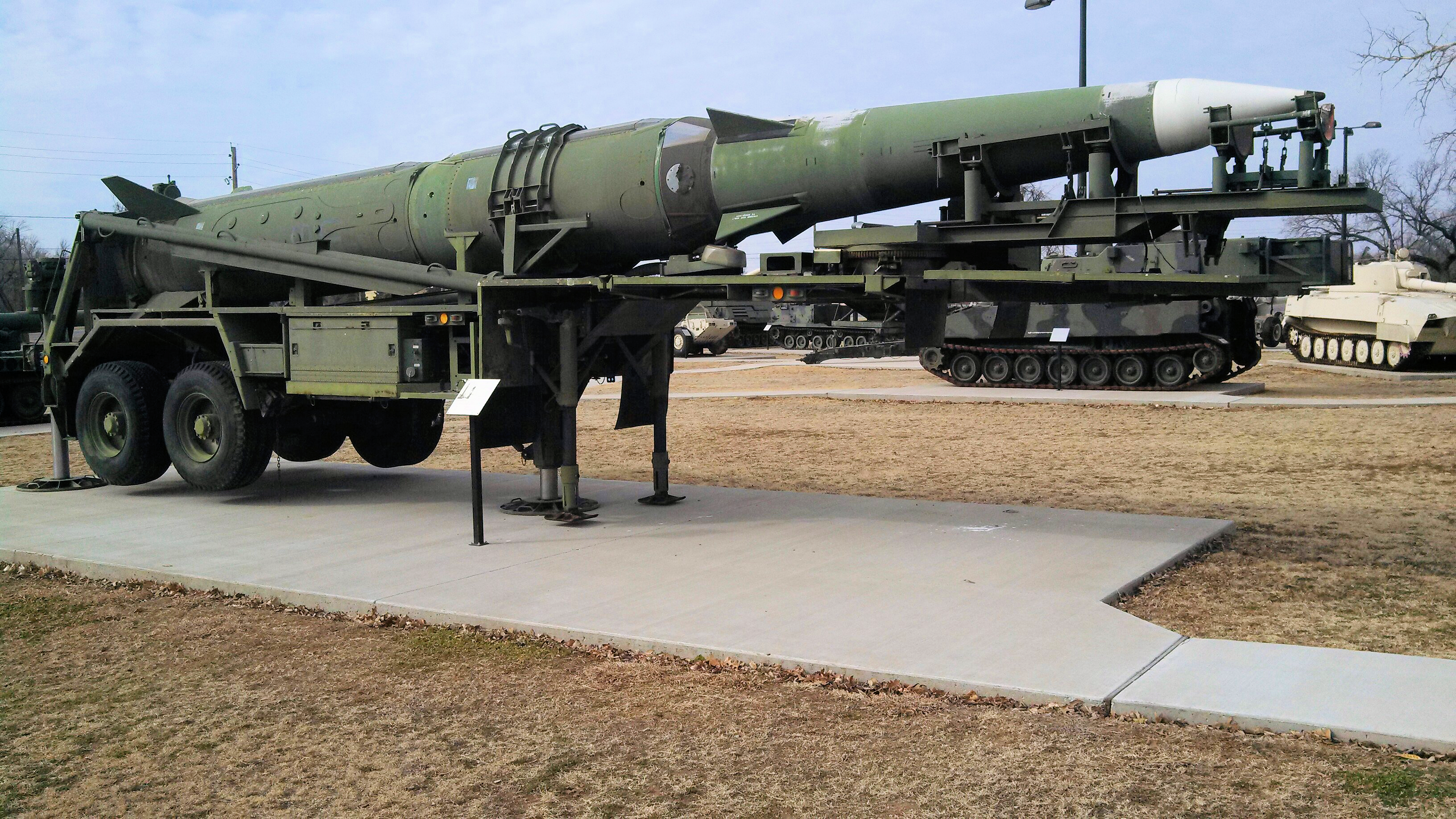
Pershing II

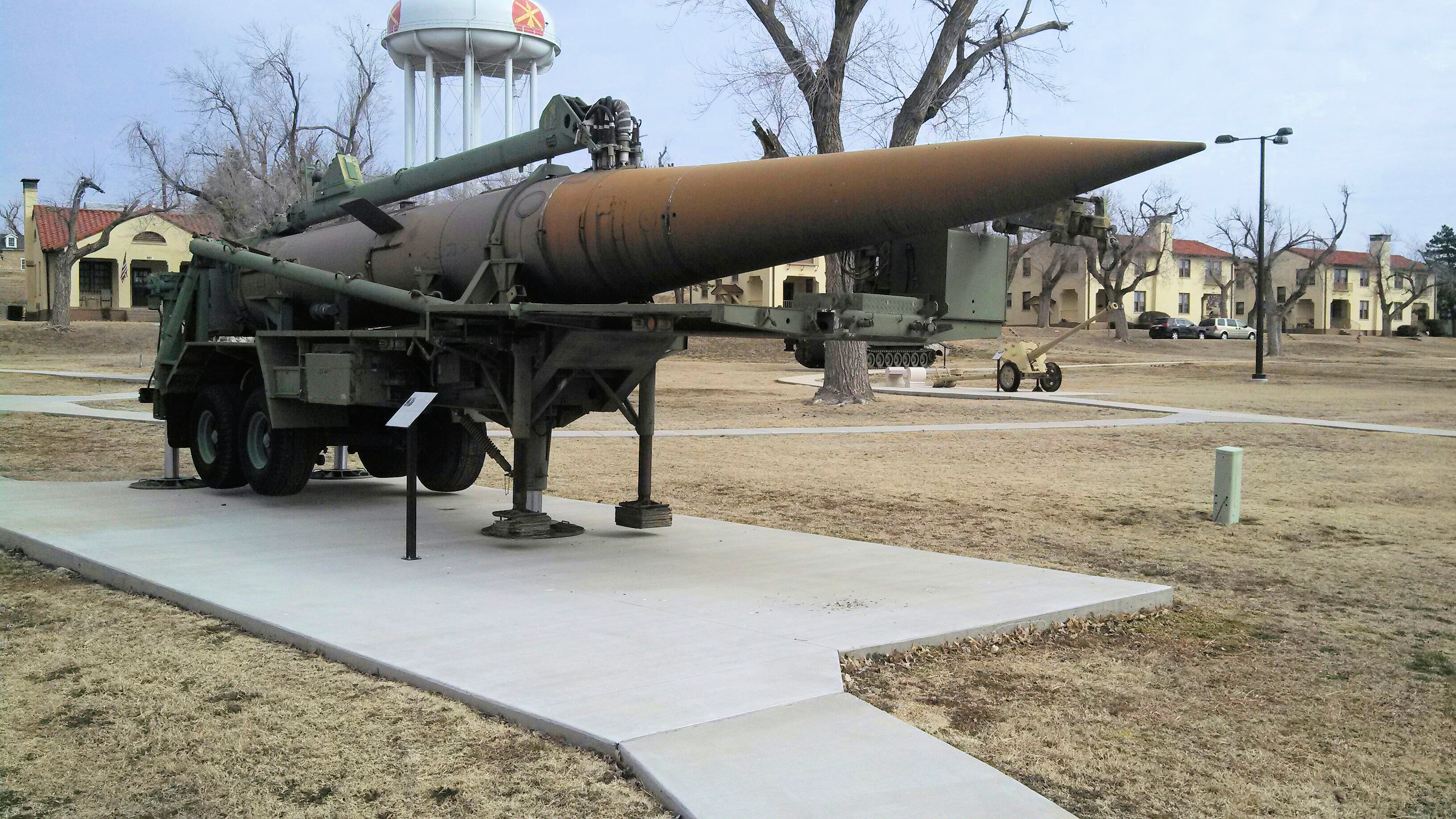
Pershing 1a

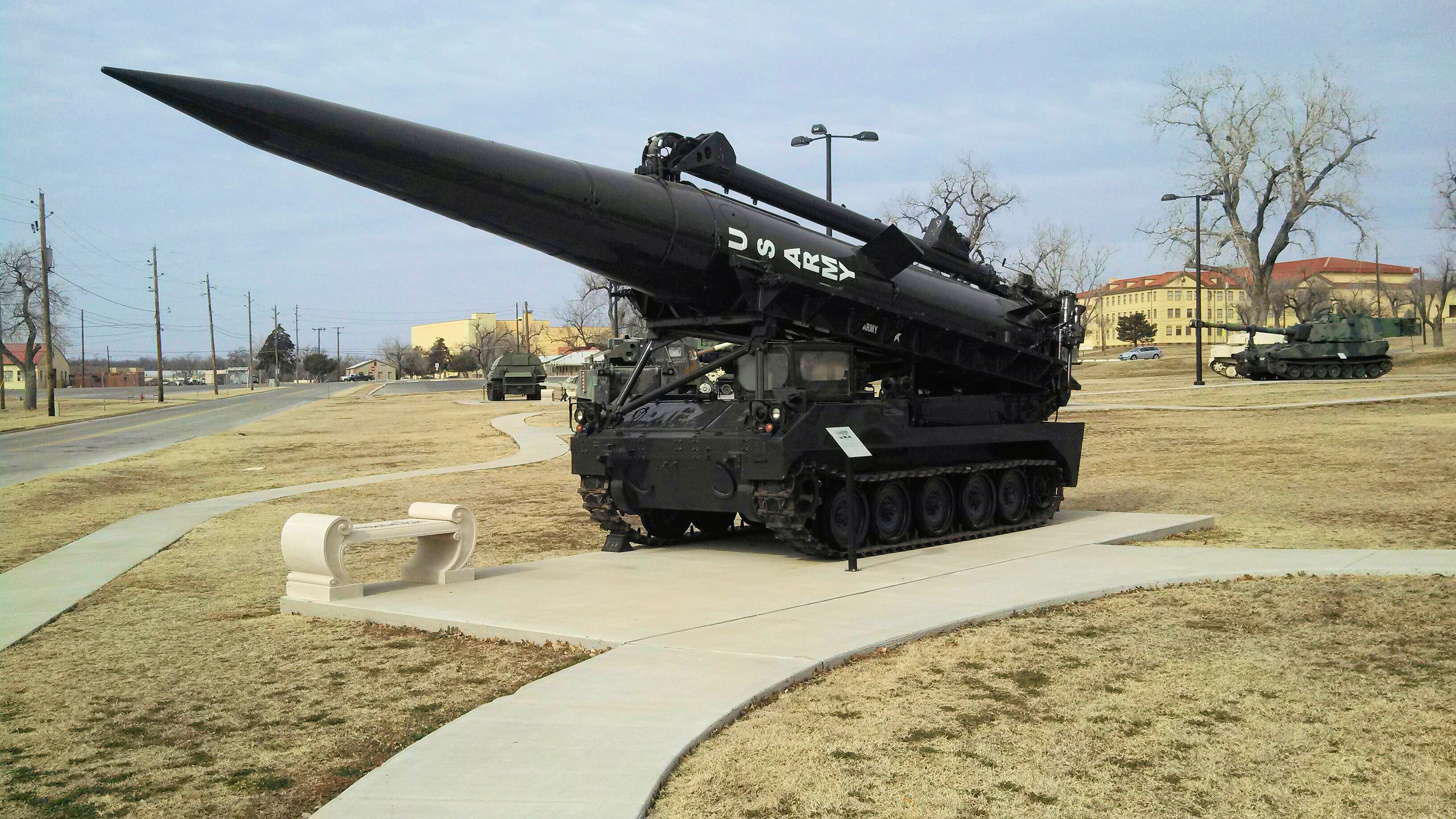
Pershing 1

=== Fort Gregg-Adams ===
The United States Army Ordnance Missile and Munitions Center and School at Redstone Arsenal, Alabama was renamed to the United States Army Ordnance Munitions and Electronic Maintenance School in 2002 and moved to Fort Lee, Virginia, now Fort Gregg-Adams, in 2011. The United States Army Ordnance Museum at Aberdeen Proving Ground, Maryland was moved to Fort Gregg-Adams in 2010 and is now the United States Army Ordnance Training and Heritage Center. The OTHC has a Pershing 1 on transporter erector launcher located at Ordnance Circle. The air fins, thrust reversal port covers, cable mast and retaining band are missing and the sign misidentifies the missile as a Pershing II.

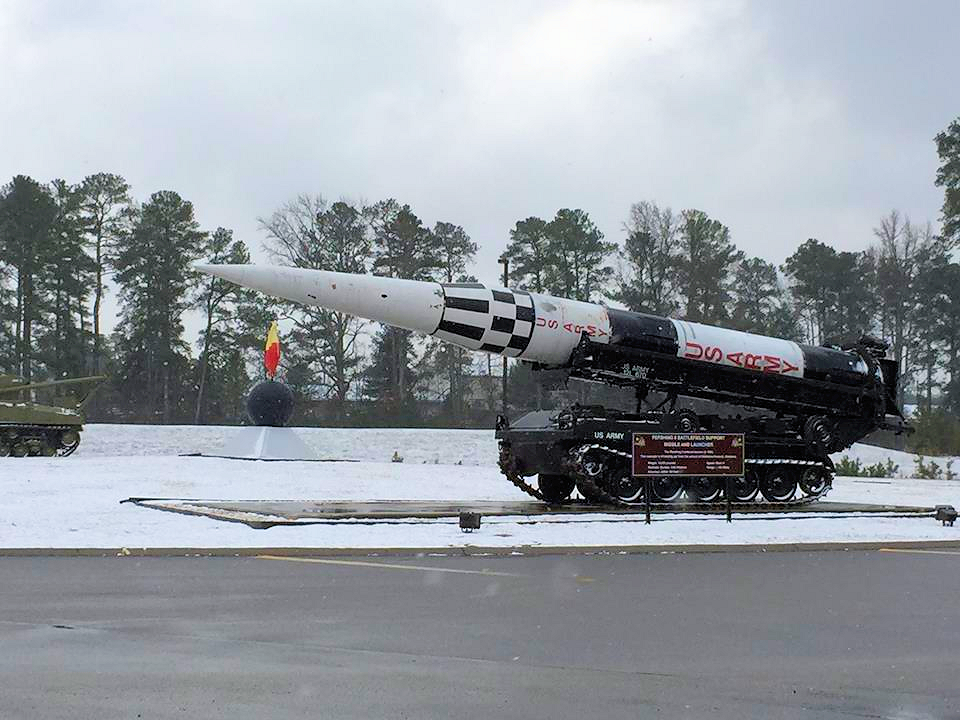
Pershing 1

=== Virginia Air and Space Science Center ===
The Virginia Air and Space Science Center, Hampton, Virginia has a Pershing II in an indoor display.

=== Militärhistorisches Museum Flugplatz Berlin-Gatow ===
The Militärhistorisches Museum Flugplatz Berlin-Gatow, Germany has a German Air Force Pershing 1a on erector launcher with Magirus-Deutz Jupiter 6x6 truck. The work platform has been removed from the erector launcher and the missile is blocked at a display angle. Beside it is a MAN truck carrying the Programmer Test Station and Power Station.

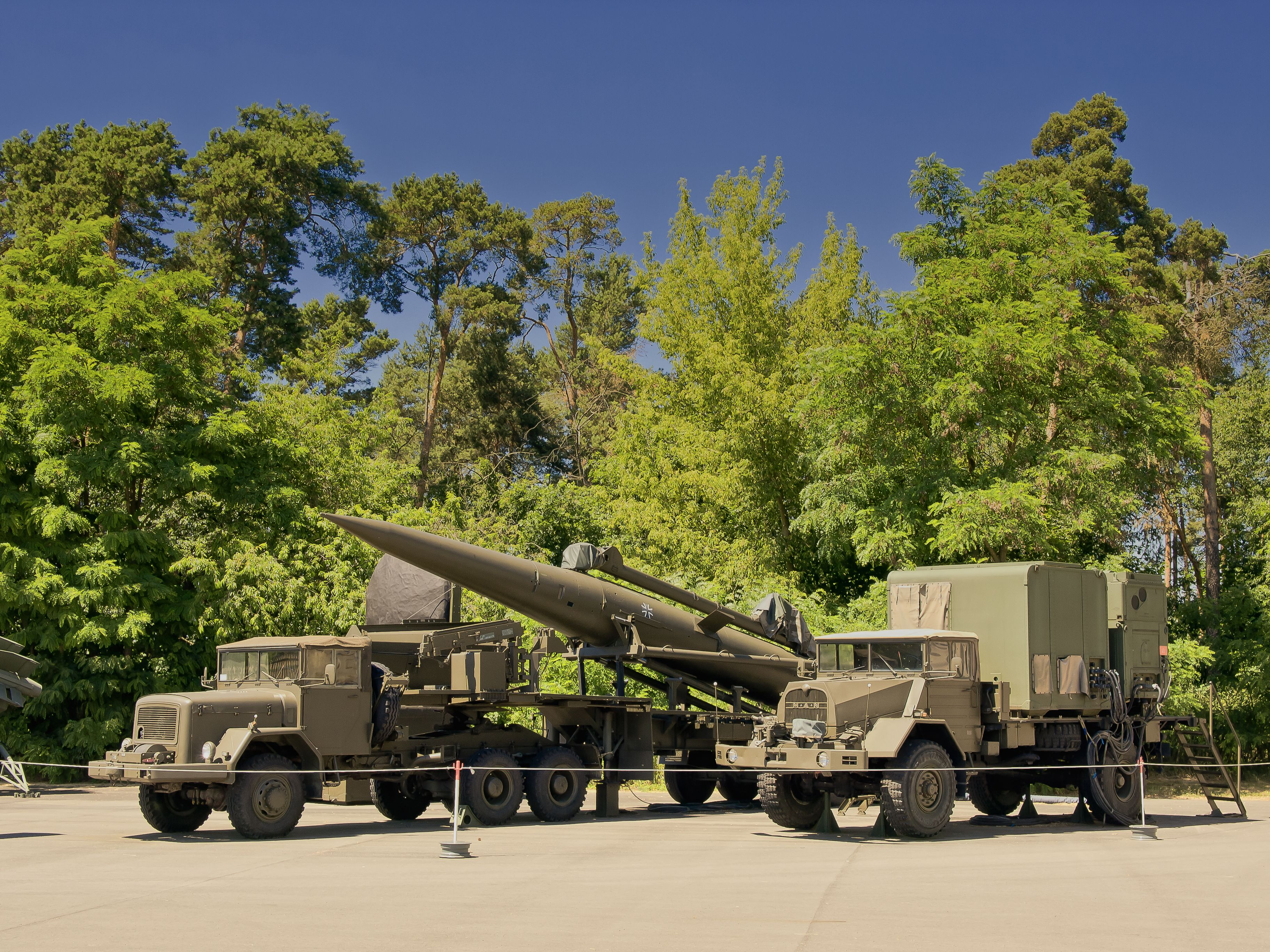
German Air Force Pershing 1a

=== Technik Museum Sinsheim ===
The Technik Museum Sinsheim, Sinsheim, Germany has an outdoor display of a German Air Force Pershing 1a on erector launcher and a programmer test station and power station on MAN 630L2A truck. A console from the Programmer Test Station is on display inside the museum.

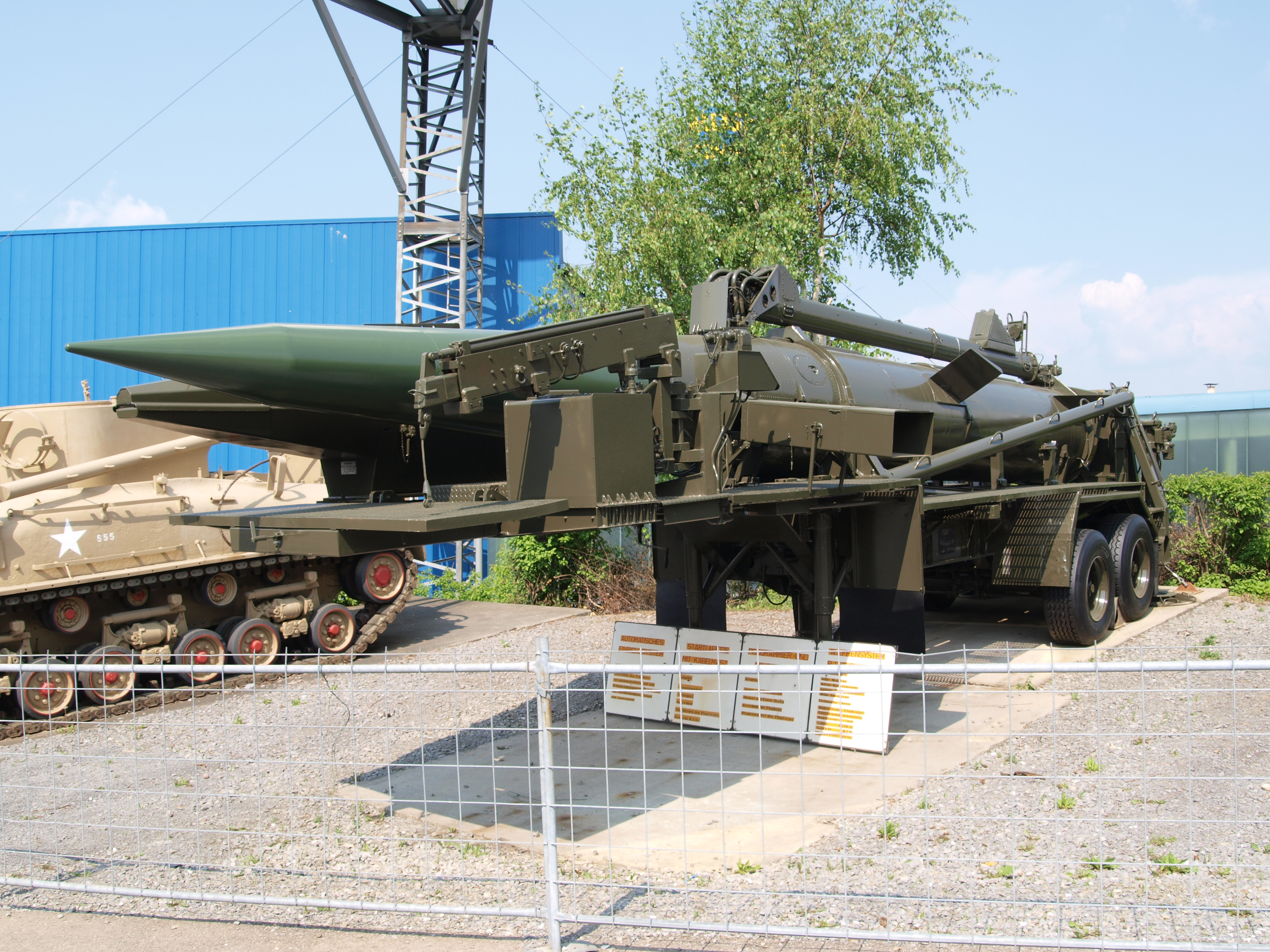
Pershing 1a

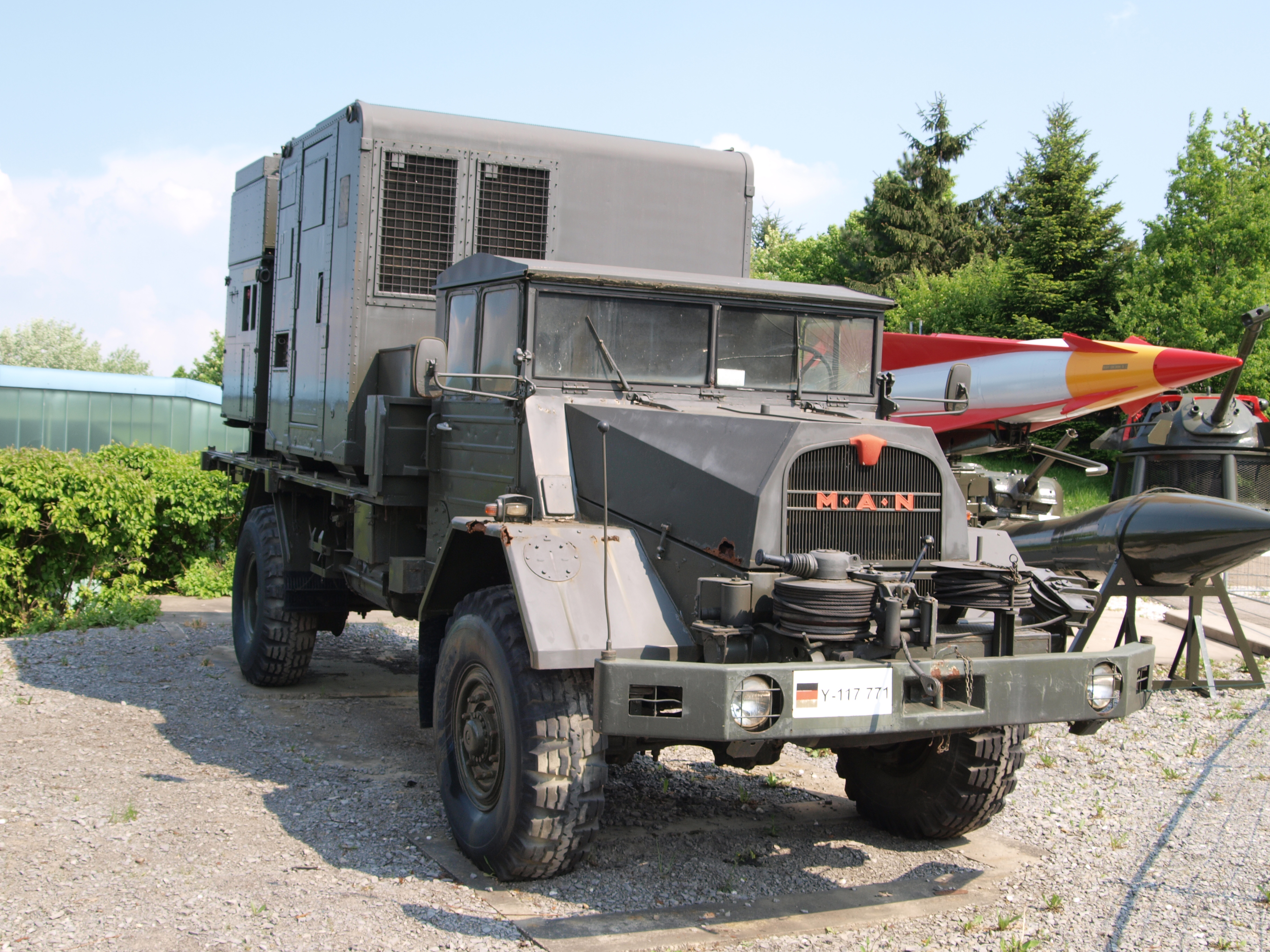
Pershing 1a Programmer Test Station and Power Station

=== Central Armed Forces Museum ===
The Central Armed Forces Museum, Moscow, Russia has a Pershing II in an outdoor display. It was received from the National Air and Space Museum in exchange for a SS-20.

External image
- Pershing II

=== SPEC OPS Plaza ===
The SPEC OPS Plaza in Jackson, Missouri is located behind the Jackson Medical Center; both are operated by Dr. Charles Pewitt. An early Pershing sits outside awaiting refurbishment.

External image
- Peshing 1

== Artifacts ==
=== National Air and Space Museum ===
- Ordnance access plate from Pershing II.

== Former displays ==
=== National Air and Space Museum ===
Two Pershing II missiles and one launcher were donated to the National Air and Space Museum, Washington, D.C. One missile was traded to the Central Armed Forces Museum for a Soviet RSD-10 Pioneer (SS-20 Saber). The Pershing II and SS-20 were displayed in the north lobby, but as of 2017 are now in storage.

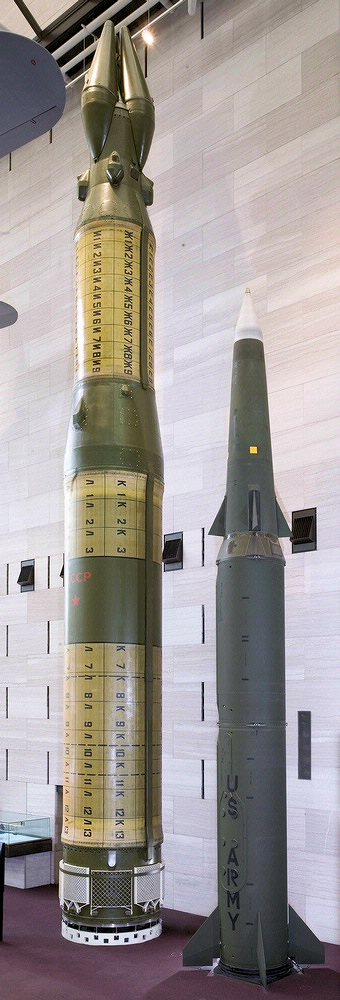
Pershing II with Soviet RSD-10 Pioneer on display

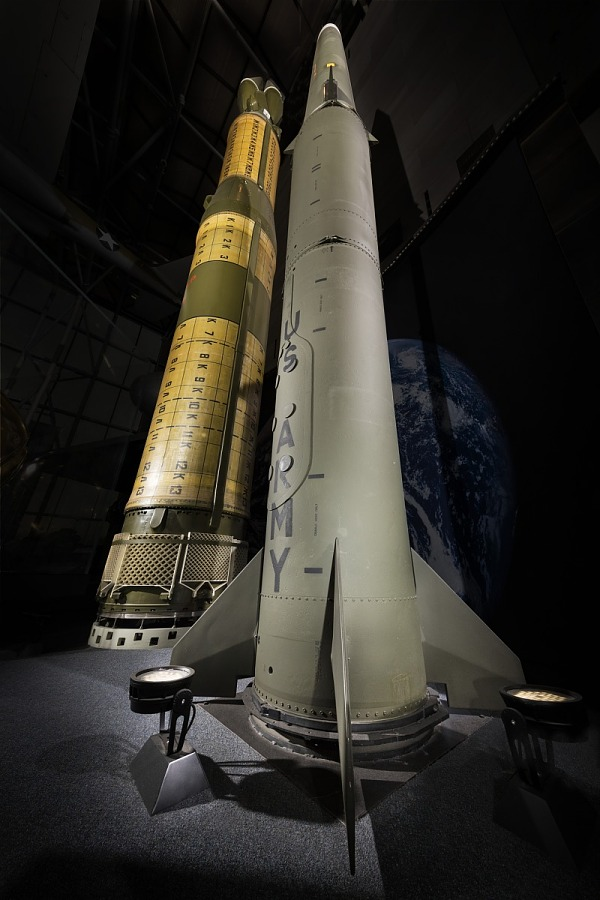
Pershing II with Soviet RSD-10 Pioneer in storage

=== Patrick Air Force Base ===
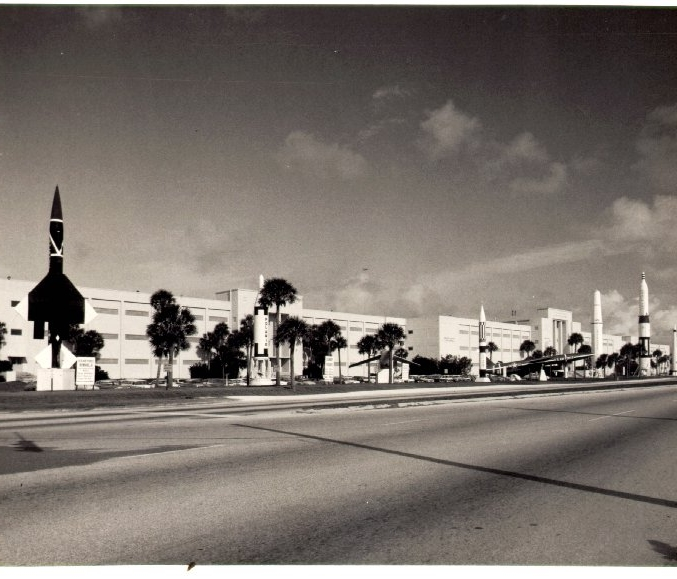
Rocket garden at Patrick AFB

A rocket garden was in front of the Air Force Technical Applications Center from the 1950s to 1996 and included a Pershing. All of the display missiles were removed due to weather damage.

=== Orlando, Florida ===
The Martin Company gave a Pershing 1 to the Orlando Sentinel in the 1960s and it was displayed in front of the offices. It was donated to VFW Post 4287 at Goldenrod Road, Orlando, Florida sometime after 1973. It was damaged in a storm and repaired. The missile was removed for repairs to the septic system. It was in bad shape and planned to be scrapped. It was given to Kim Kline who stored it at his home for four years before he donated it to the SPEC OPS Plaza in Jackson, Missouri for refurbishment and display in 2010. The plaza is located behind the Jackson Medical Center; both are operated by Dr. Charles Pewitt.

External images
- Displayed in front of the Orlando Sentinel office
- At the home of Kim Kline

=== U.S. Space & Rocket Center ===
The U.S. Space & Rocket Center, Huntsville, Alabama had all three variants of Pershing on their launchers. The three display missiles were removed from the outdoor display around 2008. The Pershing 1 was donated to the United States Army Ordnance Training and Heritage Center where it was refurbished and is now on display. The Pershing 1a and Pershing II were in storage at Redstone Arsenal in building 8021. The Pershing II was moved to storage outside of building 8022 in February 2021, awaiting movement to the Pima Air and Space Museum in Tucson, Arizona.

External images
- Pershing II
- Pershing 1

=== United States Army Ordnance Museum ===
The United States Army Ordnance Museum, Aberdeen Proving Ground, Maryland had a Pershing 1 on outdoor display. It was removed when the museum moved to Fort Lee in 2010.

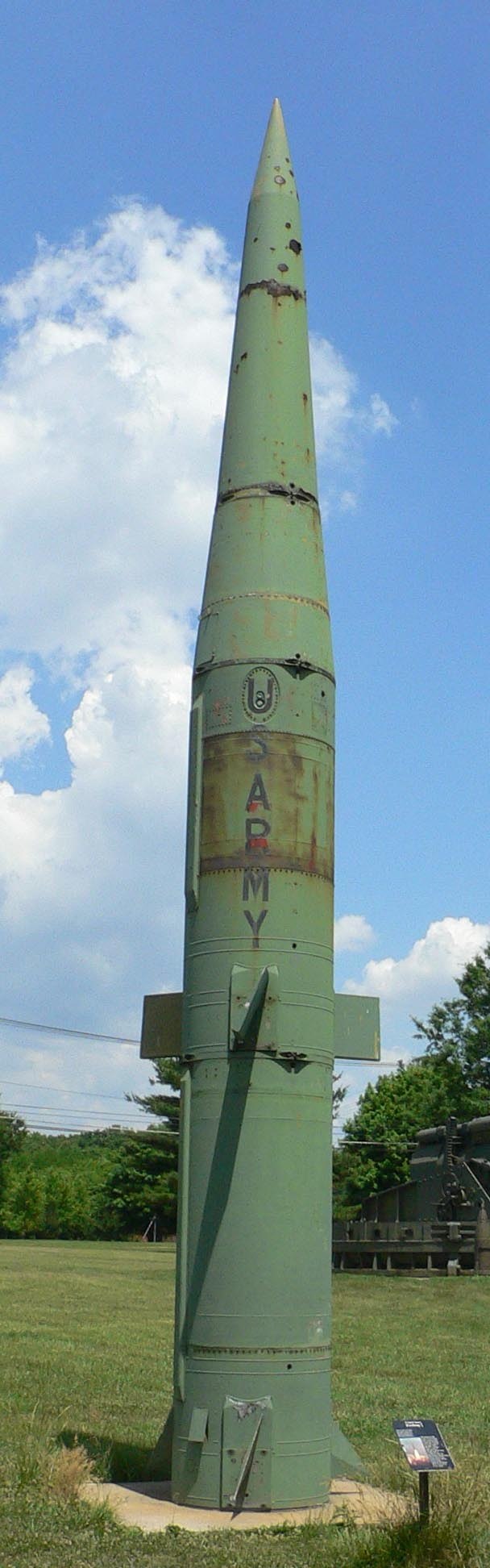
Pershing 1

=== NATO Air Base Geilenkirchen ===
NATO Air Base Geilenkirchen, Flugplatz Teveren, West Germany was the home of Missile Wing 2, West German Air Force. A Pershing 1 was on display as late as 1985.

External image
- Pershing 1

=== Wiley Kaserne ===
1st Battalion, 81st Field Artillery Regiment at Wiley Kaserne, Neu-Ulm, West Germany had a Pershing 1 displayed in front of the headquarters building from at least 1969 but removed by 1983.
