= W85 (nuclear warhead) =

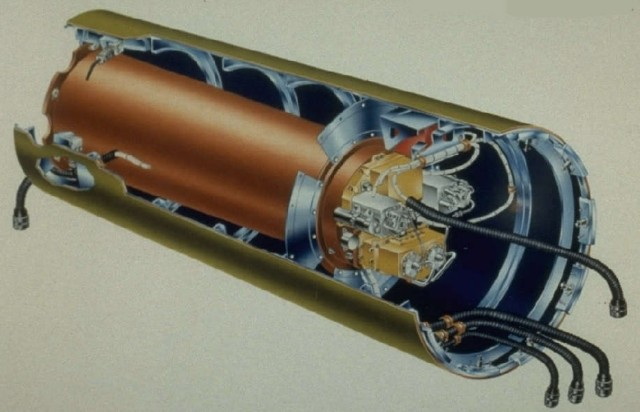
- A DOE drawing of the W85 warhead.
- Type: Nuclear weapon
- Place of origin: United States

Production history
- Designer: Los Alamos National Laboratory
- No. built: 215

Specifications
- Mass: Less than 591 pounds (268 kg)
- Blast yield: 0.3, 5, 10 or 80 kt.

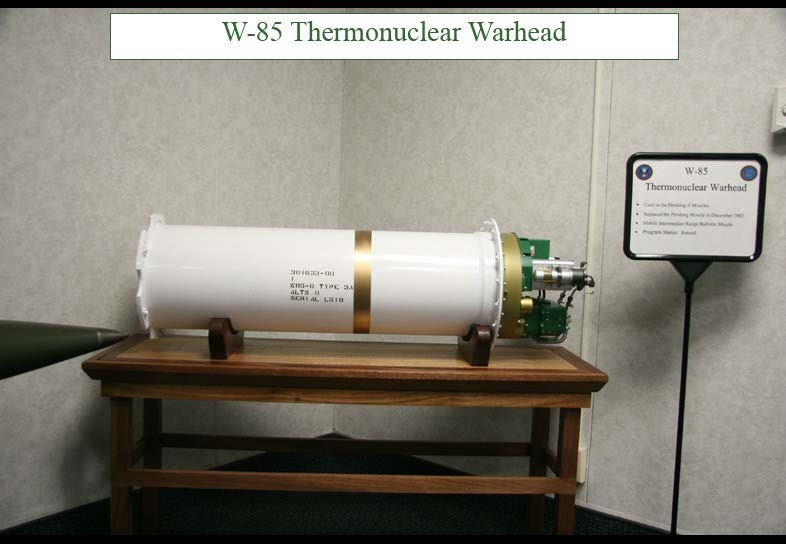
W85 warhead on display at the Nuclear Weapons Instructional Museum, Kirtland Air Force Base

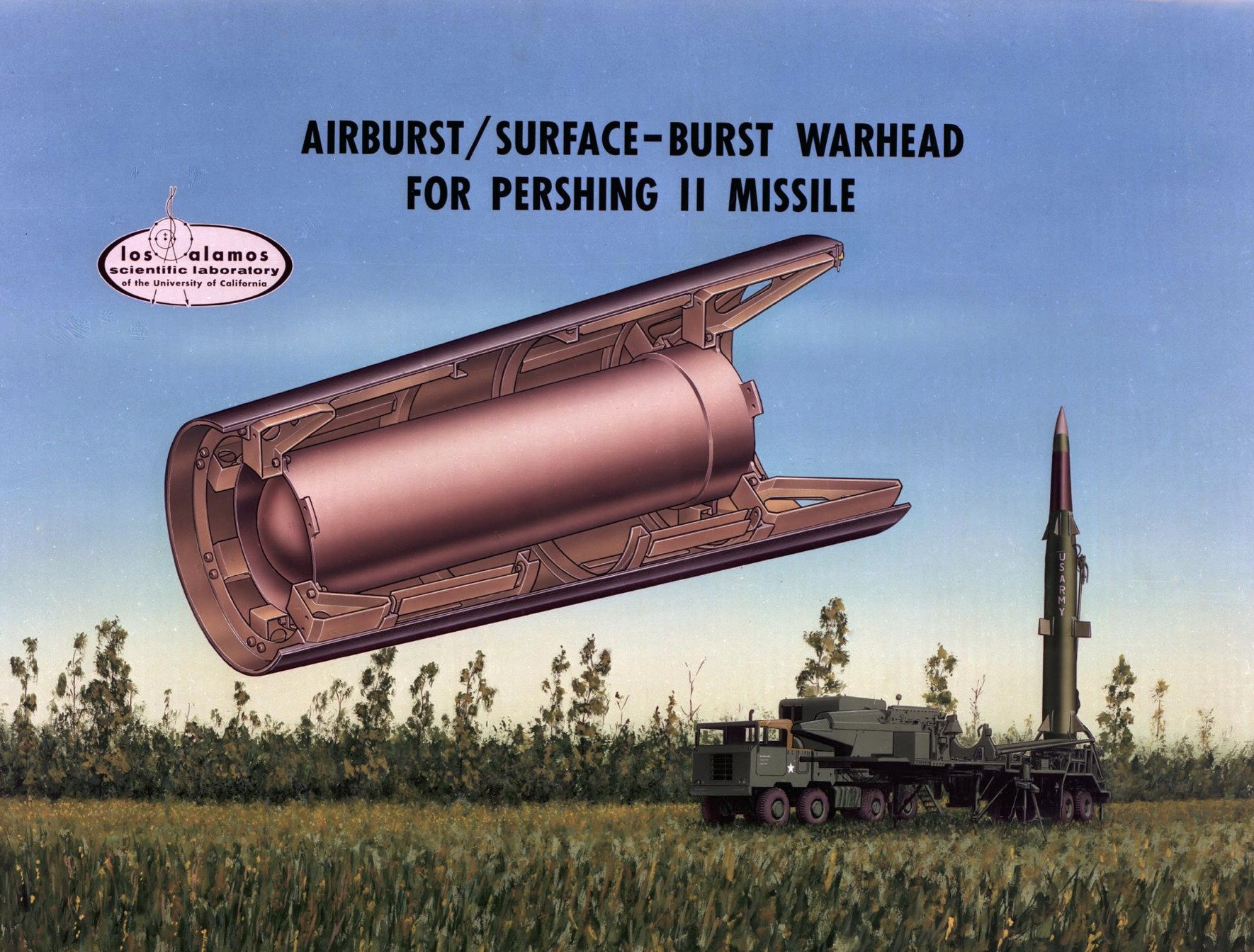
Airburst/surface burst thermonuclear warhead for Pershing II

The W85 was a thermonuclear warhead developed by the United States to arm the Pershing II missile. It was a variable yield device with a selectable yield of 0.3, 5, 10 or 80 kilotonnes of TNT (1, 21, 42 or 335 TJ).

== Overview ==
The Pershing Ia missile was armed with a 400 kilotonnes of TNT (1,700 TJ) W50 warhead. By the early 1970s, it was clear that this was far too large to allow the missile to be used as a tactical nuclear weapon—at the time, 400 kilotons was larger than many strategic warheads. The Pershing II had a high-accuracy maneuverable reentry vehicle (MARV) equipped with a radar terminal guidance system, which allowed it to use the lower-yield W85 warhead. This warhead was derived from the B61 Mod 3 and utilized the same pit in the primary stage of the warhead, but it has also been described as having a nuclear design similar to that of the B61-4. The total weight of the Pershing II warhead section was 591 pounds (268 kg), which included the reentry vehicle.

In 1987 a joint Army/Department of Energy study concluded that it was technically and financially feasible to replace the W50 warhead carried by Pershing 1a with the W85 warhead developed for Pershing II. However, with the signing of the Intermediate-Range Nuclear Forces Treaty, development on the conversion was terminated.

After the Pershing missiles were scrapped, all of the W85 warheads produced were modified into B61 Mod 10 bombs. 215 W85 warheads were manufactured.
