= 427th Reconnaissance Squadron =

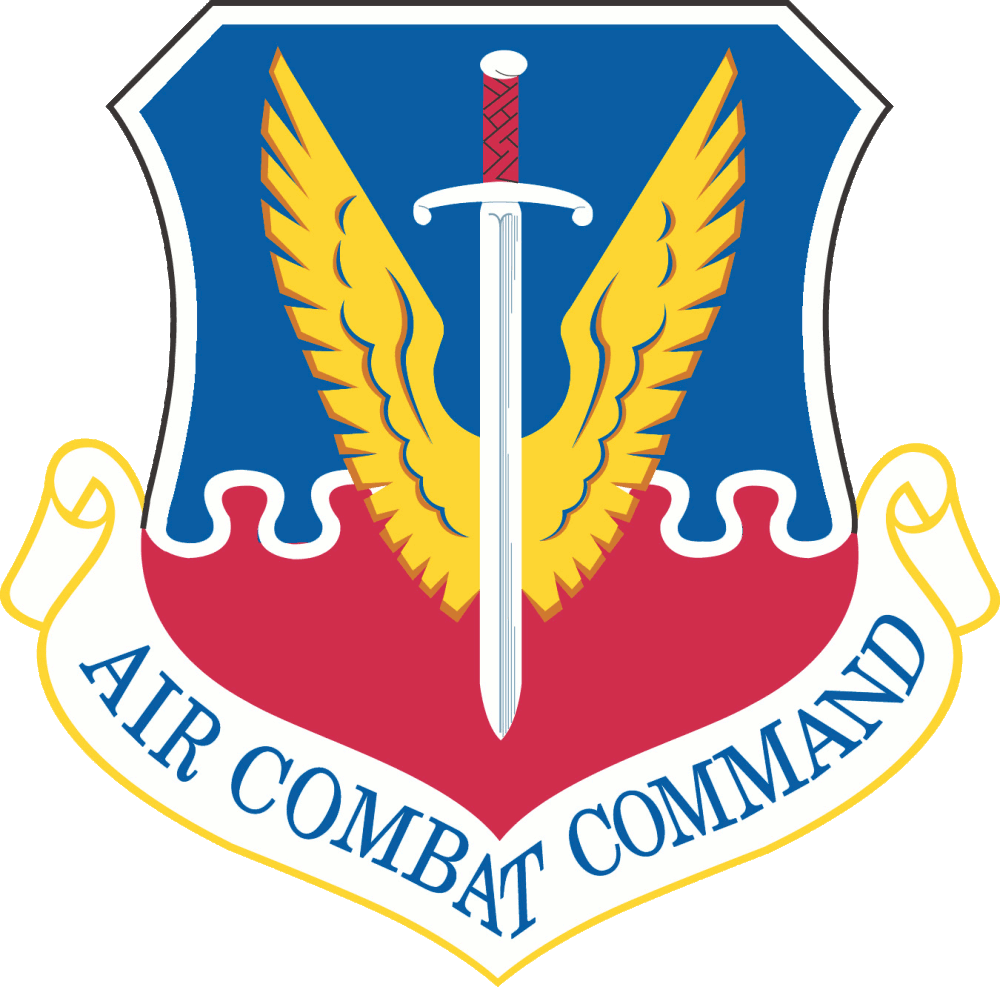
427th Reconnaissance Squadron

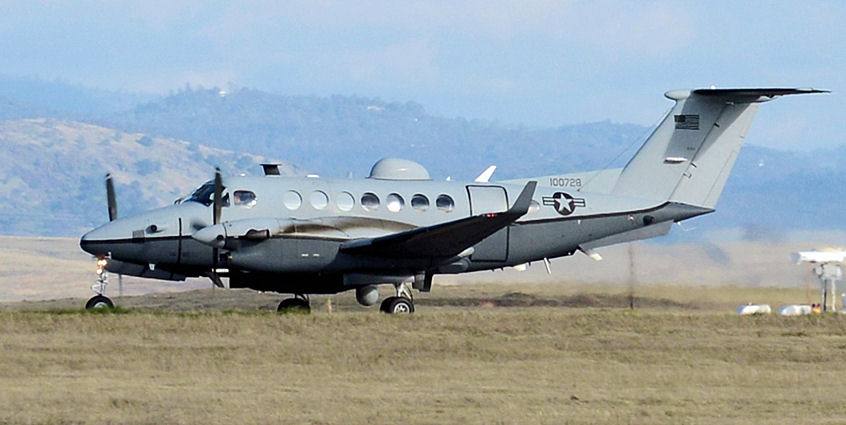
- MC-12 Liberty taking off from Beale AFB, 25 January 2013
- Active: 1917–1918; 1933–1935; 1936–1945; 1958–1962; 2012–2015; 2019-present
- Country: United States
- Branch: United States Air Force
- Role: Reconnaissance
- Part of: Air Combat Command
- Nickname: Spartans
- Mottos: Vigilant, Prepared, Dedicated (SAC era) None Shall Hide (after 2012)
- Engagements: Pacific Theater of Operations; European Theater of Operations
- Decorations: Distinguished Unit Citation; Air Force Outstanding Unit Award

Insignia
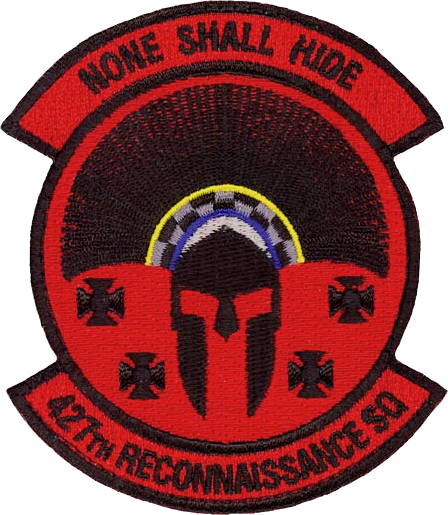
- 427th Reconnaissance Squadron emblem

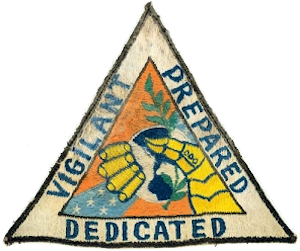
- 427th Bombardment Squadron emblem (Note: Approved 18 July 1960. Description: On an orange equilateral triangle, one point up, bordered white a SAC ribbon arched from dexter base to sinister chief, light blue spattered with white stars, surmounted by an Air Force golden yellow mailed hand issuing from sinister base and grasping a white globe, land areas Air Force blue, and a green olive branch arched throughout from the base of the triangle to its apex; outlines and details of the hand and globe Air Force blue.)

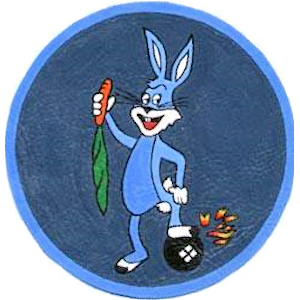
- Unofficial 427th Bombardment Squadron emblem (WW II)
- World War II group tail and squadron fuselage codes: Triangle C, GN
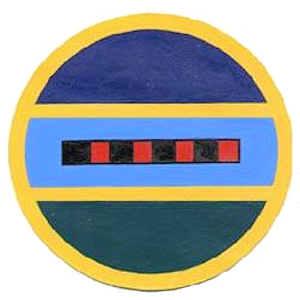
- 38th Reconnaissance Squadron emblem

The 427th Reconnaissance Squadron is an active United States Air Force (USAF) unit assigned to Beale Air Force Base, California.

The squadron's roots go back to World War I, when it was organized as the 38th Aero Squadron, a training unit that served in Texas and Illinois. When the United States Army Air Service reorganized its training units in July 1918, the squadron was renamed Squadron A, Chanute Field. Following the Armistice of 11 November 1918, the squadron was demobilized in December.

The World War I squadron was consolidated with the 38th Pursuit Squadron when that unit was activated in 1933, although it was not equipped before it was inactivated in 1935. The squadron was activated again in 1936 as the 38th Reconnaissance Squadron, forming the long range reconnaissance arm of the 1st Wing. The squadron was attached to the 19th Bombardment Group and began its deployment to join the group in the Philippines in December 1941. However, the 38th's Boeing B-17 Flying Fortresses arrived at Hickam Field while it was under attack by the Imperial Japanese Naval Air Service. Squadron planes not destroyed during the attack were diverted to other units and the squadron reformed as part of the 303d Bombardment Group. As the 427th Bombardment Squadron, it was one of the first B-17 units to deploy to the European Theater of Operations, earning a Distinguished Unit Citation as it participated in the strategic bombardment of Germany from 1942 to 1945, when it was inactivated.

The squadron was activated at Davis-Monthan Air Force Base in December 1958, when Strategic Air Command (SAC) reorganized its Boeing B-47 Stratojet wings to meet its commitment to maintain one third of its bombers on alert. In 1962, SAC began to keep half its bombers on alert and the squadron was inactivated.

The squadron was reactivated in 2012 and assigned to the 9th Operations Group of Air Combat Command at Beale, to operate the MC-12 Liberty reconnaissance aircraft and train Liberty aircrews. The squadron was inactivated in November 2015 as the USAF transferred the MC-12 mission to the United States Army.

The squadron was reactivated in 2019 at Beale and is reported to operate the Northrop Grumman RQ-180 stealth unmanned aerial vehicle surveillance aircraft.

== History ==
=== World War I ===
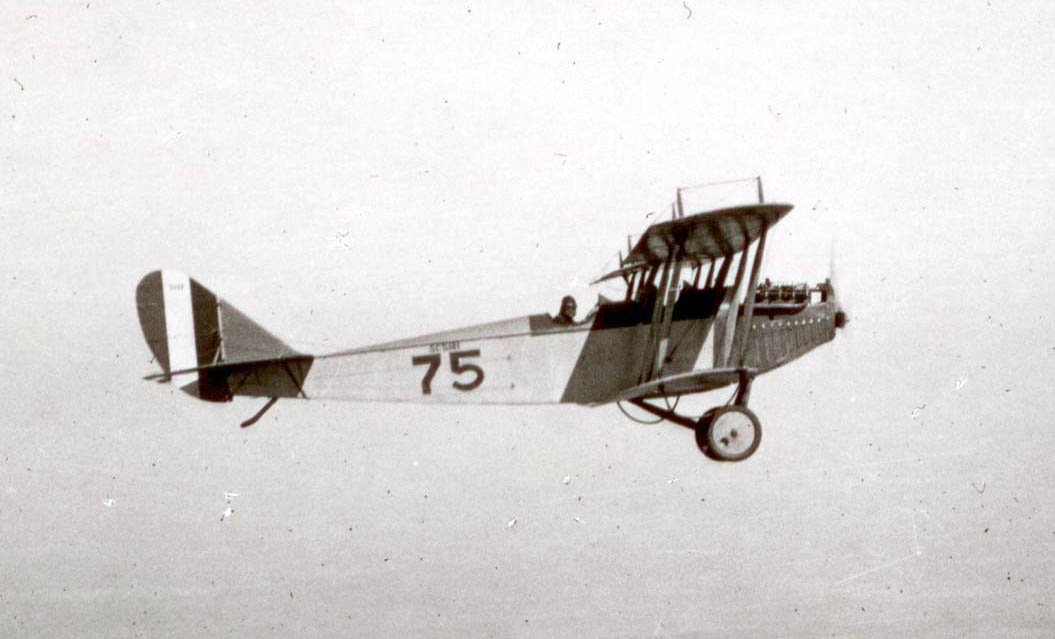
A JN-4 on a training flight

The squadron was first organized as a provisional unit at Kelly Field, Texas in June 1917. In early August the unit received formal recognition as the 38th Aero Squadron as the United States expanded the United States Army Air Service after entering World War I. A few weeks later, the squadron moved to Chanute Field, Illinois, where it served as a training unit, equipped with Curtiss JN-4 and DH-4 single engined biplanes. In July 1918, the Air Service renamed its squadrons at training fields if they were not programmed for overseas deployment as lettered squadrons and the 38th became Squadron A, Chanute Field. The squadron was demobilized in December 1918 as Chanute prepared to transition from a pilot training field into a temporary storage depot following the Armistice of 11 November 1918.

=== Interwar years ===
The Air Service constituted the 38th Pursuit Squadron in March 1923, but it remained on the inactive list. If activated or mobilized the squadron was to form part of the 16th Pursuit Group at Kelly Field, but this mobilization plan was not implemented. The squadron was finally activated in August 1933 at Selfridge Field, Michigan, after having been consolidated with the original Aero Squadron. Although the squadron was nominally assigned to the 18th Pursuit Group at Wheeler Field, Hawaii, it was attached to the 1st Pursuit Group at Selfridge. The squadron was minimally manned at Selfridge and apparently was never equipped while stationed there. In March 1935, the 38th was inactivated and simultaneously redesignated the 38th Observation Squadron.

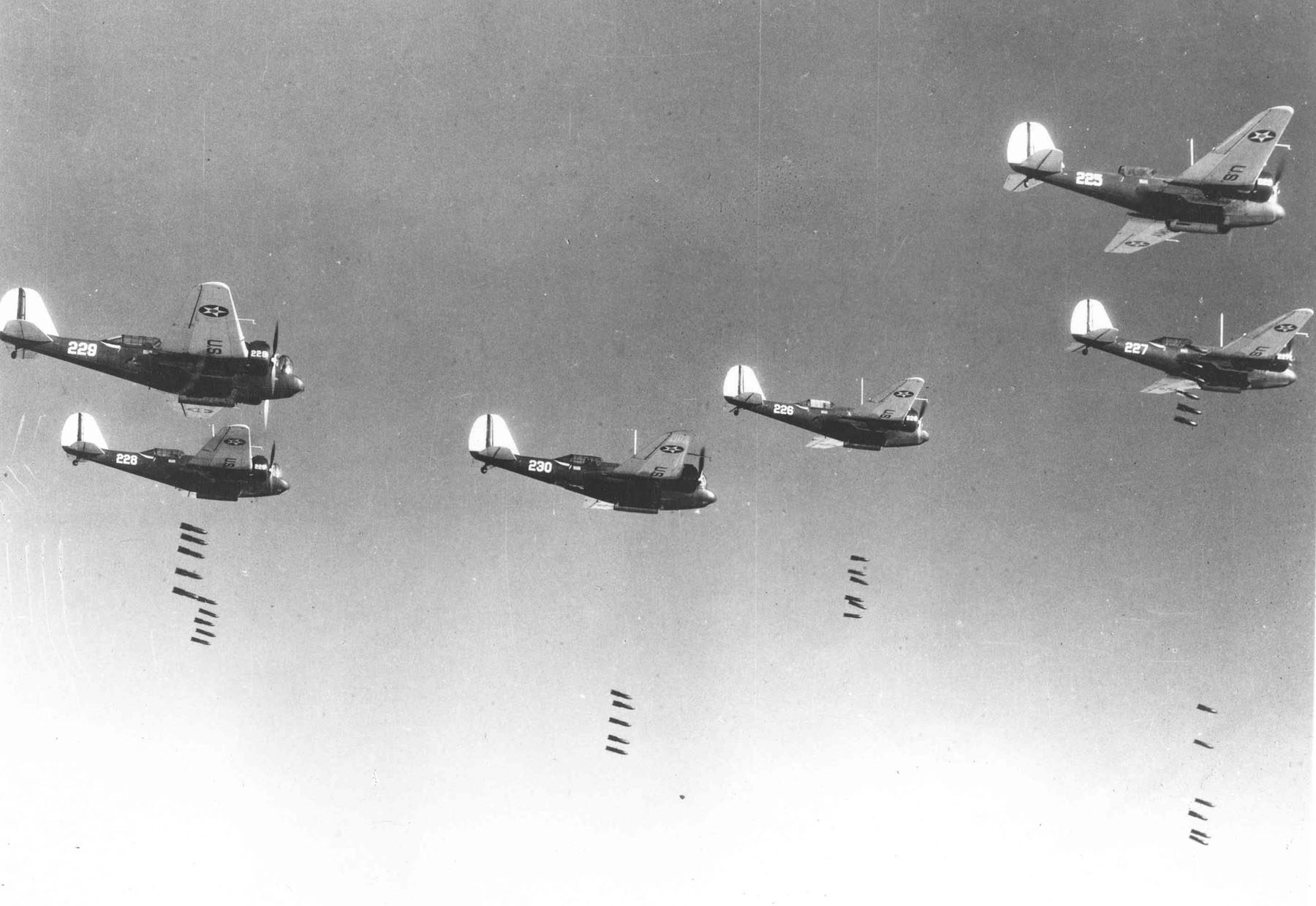
Martin B-10s bombing in formation

In September 1936, the squadron was redesignated the 38th Reconnaissance Squadron and activated at March Field, California, in 1936 as the long range reconnaissance arm of the 1st Wing, flying Martin B-10s. The group was attached to the 19th Bombardment Group, whose squadrons also flew the B-10. Like most reconnaissance squadrons of the period, the squadron flew an assortment of aircraft equipped for reconnaissance as well as its primary aircraft. In addition to the Martin Bombers, the squadron also flew Douglas OA-4 Dolphins and Northrop A-17s. The following year, the squadron added Sikorsky Y10A-8 amphibians to its list of aircraft. Along with the 19th Group, the squadron's primary aircraft was upgraded to the Douglas B-18A Bolo, then to early models of the Boeing B-17 Flying Fortress.

In June 1941, the squadron departed March along with the 19th Group for the newly constructed Army Air Base Albuquerque, New Mexico. As tensions with the Japanese Empire rose, the 19th Group was ordered to reinforce the Philippine Department Air Force. Group headquarters and the 30th and 93d Bombardment Squadrons left Albuquerque for Clark Air Base in September and October 1941.

=== World War II ===
==== Pearl Harbor and antisubmarine warfare ====
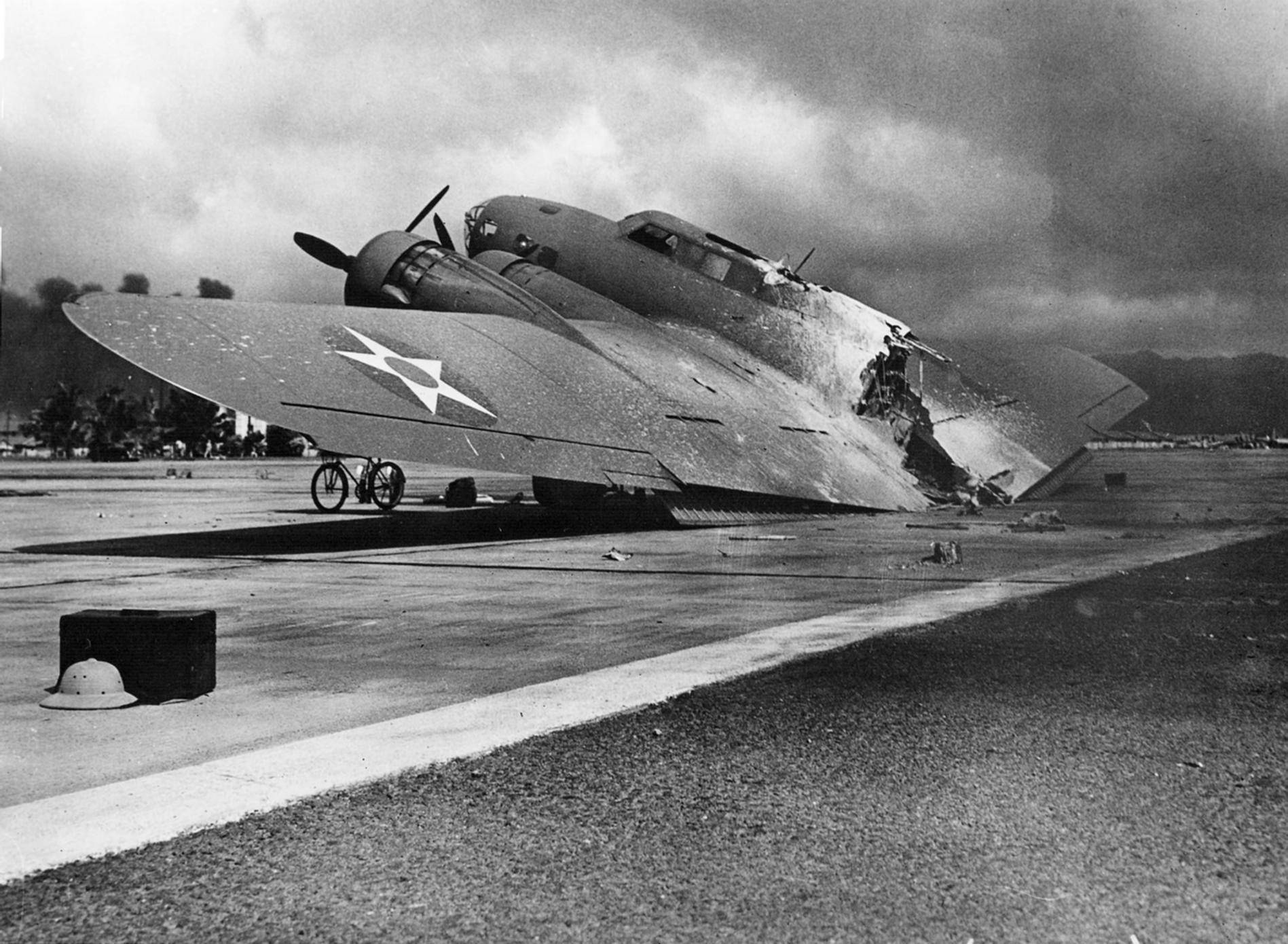
38th Reconnaissance Squadron Boeing B-17C Fortress at Hickam Field, Hawaii on 7 December 1941 (Note: This plane, serial 40-2070 was caught on approach to Hickam on 7 December 1941 by strafing Japanese fighters, who left it burned out on the ramp. The bomber's flare storage box had been struck by rounds fired by the Japanese fighters as the Fortress approached Hickam. The pilot managed to land the burning B-17, which broke in half upon hitting the runway and came to rest just short of the Hale Makai barracks. All of the crewmen but one survived the landing.)

The 38th Squadron was ordered to reinforce the 19th Group in the Philippines. Its air echelon staged through Hamilton Field, California, for deployment, but did not begin its movement to Clark Field until 6 December 1941. The squadron's B-17s arrived at Hickam Field, Hawaii on the morning of 7 December 1941 as the Imperial Japanese Naval Air Service was attacking Hickam. Most of the squadron's aircraft were destroyed or damaged as they attempted to land during the attack. From December 1941 until February 1942 the remains of the air echelon flew patrol and search missions from Hawaii under the direction of the Hawaiian Air Force when its personnel and equipment were absorbed by other units. Meanwhile, the squadron's ground echelon also departed for the Philippines on 6 December, but traveled by ship, departing from San Francisco. However, due to the Japanese attacks in Hawaii and the Philippines, its transport was ordered to return on 9 December 1941.

Following the Japanese attacks in the Pacific, the greatest danger from submarines appeared to be along the Pacific coast. Therefore, after returning to port, the ground echelon was ordered to Minter Field, California, where it jointed the Sierra Bombardment Group, a hastily formed unit made up of available planes and personnel diverted from shipment to the Philippines to defend the California coast from Japanese submarine attack. The recurring demands for antisubmarine patrols delayed the expansion and training of the squadron with a new air echelon. (Note: While the air and ground elements of the squadron were separated from December 1941 to early 1942, the official station of the squadron was the location of the ground echelon. Maurer, Combat Squadrons, pp. 523–525.)

By January 1942 it became obvious that there was no immediate threat to the Pacific coast (Note: In fact, no Japanese submarines were sunk off the Pacific coast during the entire war. Warnock, p. 6.) and the movement of aircraft to the Pacific could be resumed. In February 1942, the Sierra Bombardment Group was discontinued and the squadron returned to its assignment to the 19th Bombardment Group. In March the squadron moved to Gowen Field, Idaho, where it was attached to the 303d Bombardment Group, which had been organized the previous month, for training and expansion with a new air echelon. Shortly after its arrival at Gowen, the 303d Group's 31st Reconnaissance Squadron was inactivated and its planes and personnel were used to bring the 38th up to strength. At the end of the month, the 38th was transferred from the 19th to the 303d Bombardment Group.

==== Combat in the European Theater ====
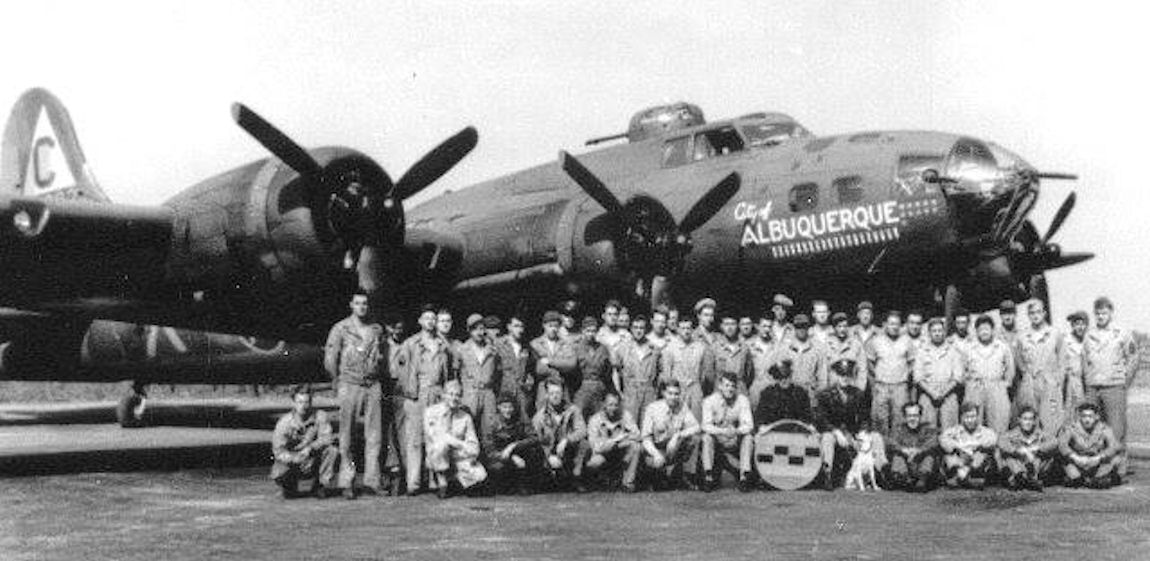
427th Squadron personnel with unit B-17 (Note: Aircraft is Boeing B-17F Flying Fortress serial 42-5392, named Stric Nine/City of Albuquerque. the aircraft shows the group "Triangle C" on the tail and symbols for 20 combat missions completed and 11 enemy aircraft shot down on its fuselage. This aircraft was lost 19 August 1943 attacking the Gilze-Rijen and Flushing Airfields in the Netherlands. Both aircrew and squadron support personnel (including the mascot dog) are included in this picture taken at Molesworth. A version of the official squadron emblem is also displayed.)

In April the Army Air Forces recognized there was little difference between the reconnaissance squadrons assigned to heavy bombardment groups and their companion bombardment squadrons, and dropped their "reconnaissance" designation. In this renaming, the 38th became the 427th Bombardment Squadron. The ground echelon departed Biggs Field, Texas, in August 1942, arriving at Fort Dix on 24 August. It sailed aboard the RMS Queen Mary and arrived in Great Britain on 10 September. The air echelon flew through Kellogg Field, Michigan, and Dow Field, Maine, before ferrying its planes across the Atlantic.

Due to the haste to move heavy bombers to Europe, the squadron was insufficiently trained for combat and it continued to train in England until it entered combat on 17 November 1942 in a strike against Saint-Nazaire, but returned without striking, having been unable to locate its target. It attacked Saint-Nazaire the following day, although its intended target was La Pallice. Its initial raids were on airfields, railroads and submarine pens in France. As a unit of one of only four Flying Fortress groups in VIII Bomber Command during late 1942 and early 1943, the squadron participated in the development of the tactics that would be used throughout the air campaign against Germany.

In 1943, the squadron began flying missions to Germany, participating in the first attack by American heavy bombers on a target in Germany, a raid on the submarine yards at Wilhelmshaven on 27 January 1943. From that time, it concentrated primarily on strategic bombardment of German industry, marshalling yards, and other strategic targets, including the ball bearing plants at Schweinfurt, shipyards at Bremen and an aircraft engine factory at Hamburg.

The 427th received a Distinguished Unit Citation when adverse weather on 11 January 1944 prevented its fighter cover from joining the group, exposing it to continuous attacks by Luftwaffe fighters. Despite this opposition, the unit successfully struck an aircraft assembly plant at Oschersleben.

Although a strategic bombing unit, the squadron was diverted on occasion to close air support and interdiction for ground forces. It attacked gun emplacements and bridges in the Pas-de-Calais during Operation Overlord, the invasion of Normandy, in June 1944; bombed enemy troops during Operation Cobra, the breakout at Saint Lo, and during the Battle of the Bulge. It bombed military installations near Wesel during Operation Lumberjack, the Allied assault across the Rhine. Its last combat mission was an attack on 25 April 1945 against an armament factory at Plzeň.

Following VE Day in May 1945 the 303d Group was reassigned to the North African Division, Air Transport Command and moved to Casablanca Airfield, French Morocco, to use its B-17 bombers as transports, ferrying personnel from France to Morocco. However, the two B-17 groups moved to Casablanca proved surplus to Air Transport Command's needs and the squadron was inactivated in late July 1945 and its planes ferried back to the United States.

=== Strategic Air Command ===
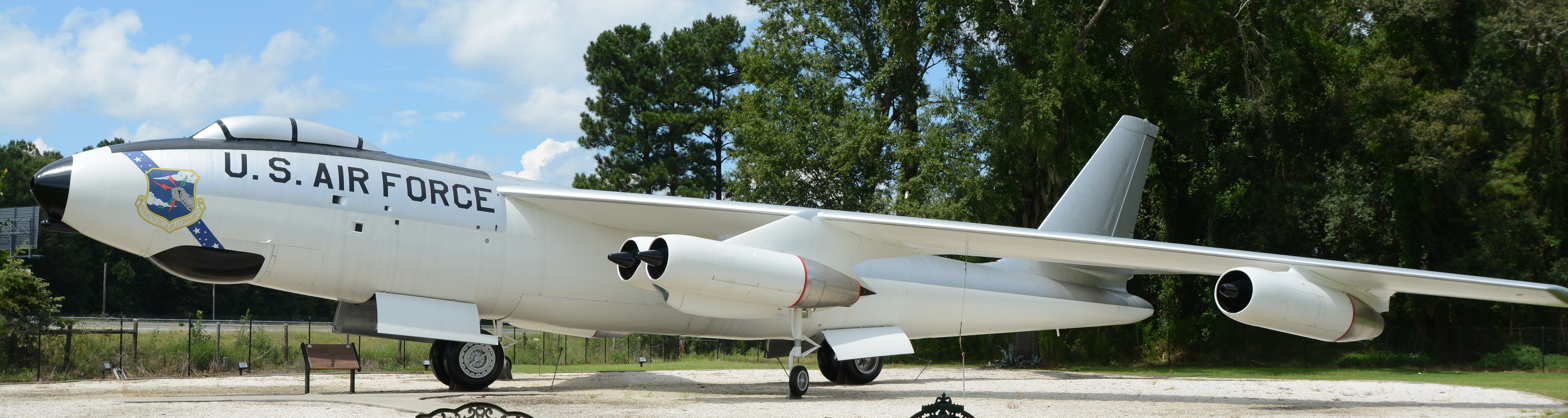
Boeing B-47 in SAC markings

From 1958, the Boeing B-47 Stratojet wings of Strategic Air Command (SAC) began to assume an alert posture at their home bases, reducing the amount of time spent on alert at overseas bases. The SAC alert cycle divided itself into four parts: planning, flying, alert and rest to meet General Thomas S. Power's initial goal of maintaining one third of SAC's planes on fifteen minute ground alert, fully fueled and ready for combat to reduce vulnerability to a Soviet missile strike. To implement this new system B-47 wings reorganized from three to four squadrons. The 427th was activated at Davis-Monthan Air Force Base as the fourth squadron of the 303d Bombardment Wing. The alert commitment was increased to half the wing's aircraft in 1962 and the four squadron pattern no longer met the alert cycle commitment, so the squadron was inactivated on 1 January 1962.

=== Reconnaissance mission returns ===
The 427th Reconnaissance Squadron was activated at Beale Air Force Base, California, in May 2012 to manage combat readiness training for the MC-12W Liberty. It organized, trained, equipped and deployed MC-12W aircraft and aircrew in support of combat commander directed operational requirements. Its personnel included pilots, sensor operators and supporting airment.

During its tenure at Beale, the 427th flew 4,770 combat missions, which resulted claims that over 500 enemy combatants were eliminated. The MC-12W mission was transferred from the United States Air Force to the United States Army in October 2015 and the squadron was inactivated in a ceremony held on 20 November 2015.

The squadron was reactivated at Beale in 2019. According to an October 2019 report by Aviation Week & Space Technology the squadron operates the Northrop Grumman RQ-180 stealth unmanned aerial vehicle (UAV) surveillance aircraft.

== Lineage ==
38th Aero Squadron

- Organized as the 38th Provisional Aero Squadron on 12 June 1917

Redesignated 38th Aero Squadron on 3 August 1917
Redesignated Squadron A, Chanute Field, Illinois on 13 July 1918
Demobilized on 1 December 1918
Reconstituted c. 1 August 1933 and consolidated with the 38th Pursuit Squadron as the 38th Pursuit Squadron

427th Reconnaissance Squadron

- Constituted as the 38th Pursuit Squadron on 24 March 1923

Consolidated with Squadron A, Chanute Field, Illinois c. 1 August 1933
Activated on 1 August 1933
Redesignated 38th Observation Squadron (Long Range, Light Bombardment) and inactivated on 1 March 1935
Redesignated 38th Reconnaissance Squadron and activated on 1 September 1936
Redesignated 38th Reconnaissance Squadron (Long Range) on 6 December 1939
Redesignated 38th Reconnaissance Squadron (Heavy) on 20 November 1940
Redesignated 427th Bombardment Squadron (Heavy) on 22 April 1942
Redesignated 427th Bombardment Squadron, Heavy c. 20 August 1943
Inactivated on 25 July 1945
Redesignated 427th Bombardment Squadron, Medium on 20 August 1958
Activated on 1 December 1958
Discontinued and inactivated on 1 January 1962
Redesignated 427th Reconnaissance Squadron on 17 August 2011
Activated on 1 May 2012
Inactivated c. 20 November 2015
Reactivated c. 2019

=== Assignments ===
- Post Headquarters, Kelly Field, 12 June 1917
- Post Headquarters, Chanute Field, 25 August 1917 – 1 December 1918
- 18th Pursuit Group (attached to 1st Pursuit Group), 1 August 1933 – 1 March 1935
- 1st Wing (later 1st Bombardment Wing) (attached to 19th Bombardment Group), 1 September 1936
- IV Bomber Command, 19 September 1941 (remained attached to 19th Bombardment Group)
- Sierra Bombardment Group, 16 December 1941
- Fourth Air Force, 17 January 1942 (attached to IV Bomber Command after 26 January 1942)
- 19th Bombardment Group, 25 February 1942 (attached to 303d Bombardment Group c. 13 March 1942)
- 303d Bombardment Group, 31 March 1942 – 25 July 1945
- 303d Bombardment Wing, 1 December 1958 – 1 January 1962
- 9th Operations Group, 1 May 2012 – c. 20 November 2015

=== Stations ===
- Camp Kelly (later Kelly Field), Texas, 12 June 1917
- Chanute Field, Illinois, 25 August 1917 – 1 December 1918
- Selfridge Field, Michigan, 1 August 1933 – 1 March 1935
- March Field, California, 1 September 1936
- Army Air Base Albuquerque, New Mexico, 5 June – 22 November 1941
- Minter Field, California, 17 December 1941
- Gowen Field, Idaho, 13 March 1942 (operated from Muroc Army Air Field, California, 28 May – c. 14 June 1942)
- Alamogordo Army Air Field, New Mexico, 18 June 1942
- Biggs Field, Texas, 7 – 22 August 1942
- RAF Molesworth (Station 107), England, 12 September 1942
- Casablanca Airfield, French Morocco, c. 31 May – 25 July 1945
- Davis-Monthan Air Force Base, Arizona, 1 December 1958 – 1 January 1962
- Beale Air Force Base, California, 1 May 2012 – c. 20 November 2015, 2019–present

=== Aircraft ===
- Curtiss JN-4, 1917–1918
- DH-4 Liberty Plane, 1917–1918 (Note: Most, but not all, DH-4s built in the United States were built by the Dayton-Wright company.)
- Martin B-10B, 1936–1939
- Boeing B-17B/C Flying Fortress, 1937–1941
- Douglas B-18A Bolo, 1937–1941
- Douglas OA-4 Dolphin, 1936–1941
- Northrop A-17A, 1936–1941
- Sikorsky Y10A-8, 1937–1941
- Boeing B-17 Flying Fortress, 1942–1945
- Boeing B-47 Stratojet, 1958–1961
- Beechcraft MC-12W Liberty, 2012–2015

=== Awards and campaigns ===
Award streamer	Award	Dates	Notes
	Distinguished Unit Citation	11 January 1944 Germany	427th Bombardment Squadron
	Air Force Meritorious Unit Award	1 June 2013 – 31 May 2015	427th Reconnaissance Squadron
	Air Force Outstanding Unit Award	1 January 1961 – September 1961	427th Bombardment Squadron
	Air Force Outstanding Unit Award	1 June 2014 – 31 May 2015	427th Reconnaissance Squadron

Campaign Streamer	Campaign	Dates	Notes
	Central Pacific	7 December 1941 – c. February 1942	38th Reconnaissance Squadron
	Antisubmarine, Asiatic Pacific Theater	7 December 1941 – c. February 1942	38th Reconnaissance Squadron
	Antisubmarine	7 December 1941 – c. February 142	38th Reconnaissance Squadron
	Air Offensive, Europe	12 September 1942 – 5 June 1944	427th Bombardment Squadron
	Normandy	6 June 1944 – 24 July 1944	427th Bombardment Squadron
	Northern France	25 July 1944 – 14 September 1944	427th Bombardment Squadron
	Rhineland	15 September 1944 – 21 March 1945	427th Bombardment Squadron
	Ardennes-Alsace	16 December 1944 – 25 January 1945	427th Bombardment Squadron
	Central Europe	22 March 1944 – 21 May 1945	427th Bombardment Squadron
	Air Combat, EAME Theater	12 September 1942 – 11 May 1945	427th Bombardment Squadron

== See also ==
- List of American Aero Squadrons
- Lee Embree (photographer aboard squadron plane during Pearl Harbor Attack)
- List of United States Air Force reconnaissance squadrons
- B-17 Flying Fortress units of the United States Army Air Forces
- List of B-47 units of the United States Air Force
