= 359th Bombardment Squadron =

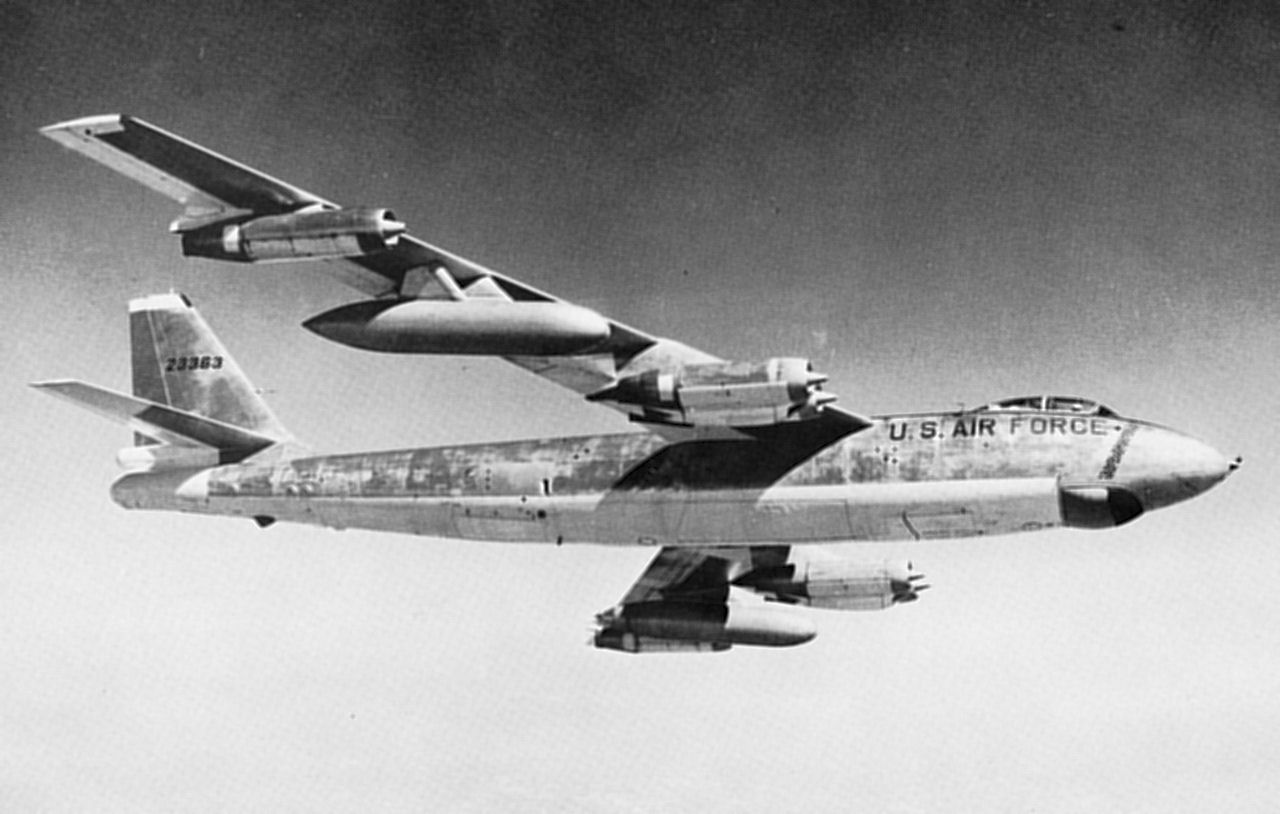
- Lockheed B-47E Stratojet 52-3363
- Active: 1942–1945; 1947-1947; 1951–1964
- Country: United States
- Branch: United States Air Force
- Role: Bombardment
- Motto: Caveat Emptor (Latin for 'Let the Buyer Beware') (from 1955)
- Engagements: European Theater of Operations
- Decorations: Distinguished Unit Citation; Air Force Outstanding Unit Award

Insignia
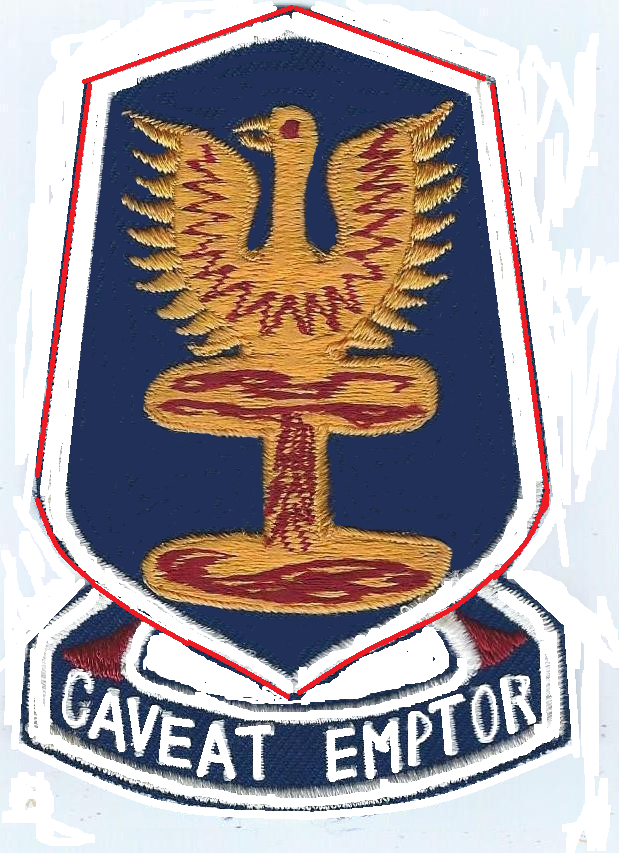
- 359th Bombardment Squadron emblem (Note: Approved 5 December 1955. Description: On a shield, Air Force blue, within a border white, edged red, a stylized mythical Phoenix rising from an atomic cloud, all in variegated shades of yeelow, white, red, white and blue.)

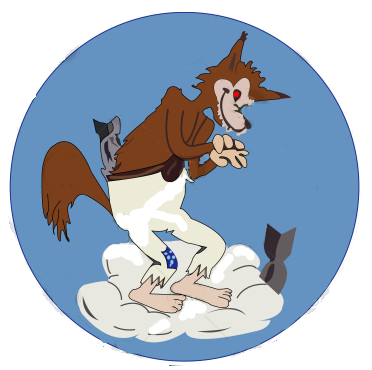
- 359th Bombardment Squadron emblem (World War II)
- World War II fuselage code: BN

The 359th Bombardment Squadron is an inactive United States Air Force unit. It was last assigned to the 303rd Bombardment Wing, stationed at Davis–Monthan Air Force Base, Arizona, where it was inactivated on 15 June 1964.

The squadron was first activated in February 1942. It began training for overseas deployment, but was diverted to conduct antisubmarine warfare in the Pacific. It deployed to the European Theater of Operations in August 1942, but conducted further training before entering the strategic bombing campaign against Germany. It flew combat missions until V-E Day, earning a Distinguished Unit Citation for an attack on Oschersleben. 1st Lieutenant Jack W. Mathis, a squadron bombardier, was awarded the Medal of Honor for his actions during an attack on Bremen-Vegesack in 1943. It flew transport missions between France and Morocco before inactivating in July 1945.

The squadron was briefly activated as a paper unit in 1947. In 1951, it was activated as a medium bomber unit under Strategic Air Command, training in strategic bomber operations. The squadron stood nuclear alert, and dispersed its alert aircraft during the Cuban Missile Crisis.

== History ==
The 359th Bombardment Squadron was established in February 1942 as a Boeing B-17 Flying Fortress heavy bomber squadron at Pendleton Field, Oregon and assigned to the 303d Bombardment Group. It moved to Gowen Field, Idaho, where it trained under Second Air Force. The squadron deployed to Southern California to fly antisubmarine patrols over the Pacific. The 359th completed training in southwest by August 1942. The ground echelon departed Biggs Field, Texas in August 1942, arriving at Fort Dix on 24 August. It sailed aboard the RMS Queen Mary and arrived in Great Britain on 10 September. The air echelon flew through Kellogg Field, Michigan and Dow Field, Maine before ferrying its planes across the Atlantic.

=== Combat in the European Theater ===
Due to the haste to move heavy bombers to Europe, the squadron was insufficiently trained for combat and it continued to train in England until it entered combat on 17 November 1942 in a strike against Saint-Nazaire, but returned without striking, having been unable to locate its target. It attacked Saint-Nazaire the following day, although its intended target was La Pallice. Its initial raids were on airfields, railroads and submarine pens in France. As a unit of one of only four Flying Fortress groups in VIII Bomber Command during late 1942 and early 1943, the squadron participated in the development of the tactics that would be used throughout the air campaign against Germany.

In 1943, the squadron began flying missions to Germany, participating in the first attack by American heavy bombers on a target in Germany, a raid on the submarine yards at Wilhelmshaven on 27 January 1943. From that time, it concentrated primarily on strategic bombardment of German industry, marshalling yards, and other strategic targets, including the ball bearing plants at Schweinfurt, shipyards at Bremen and an aircraft engine factory at Hamburg.

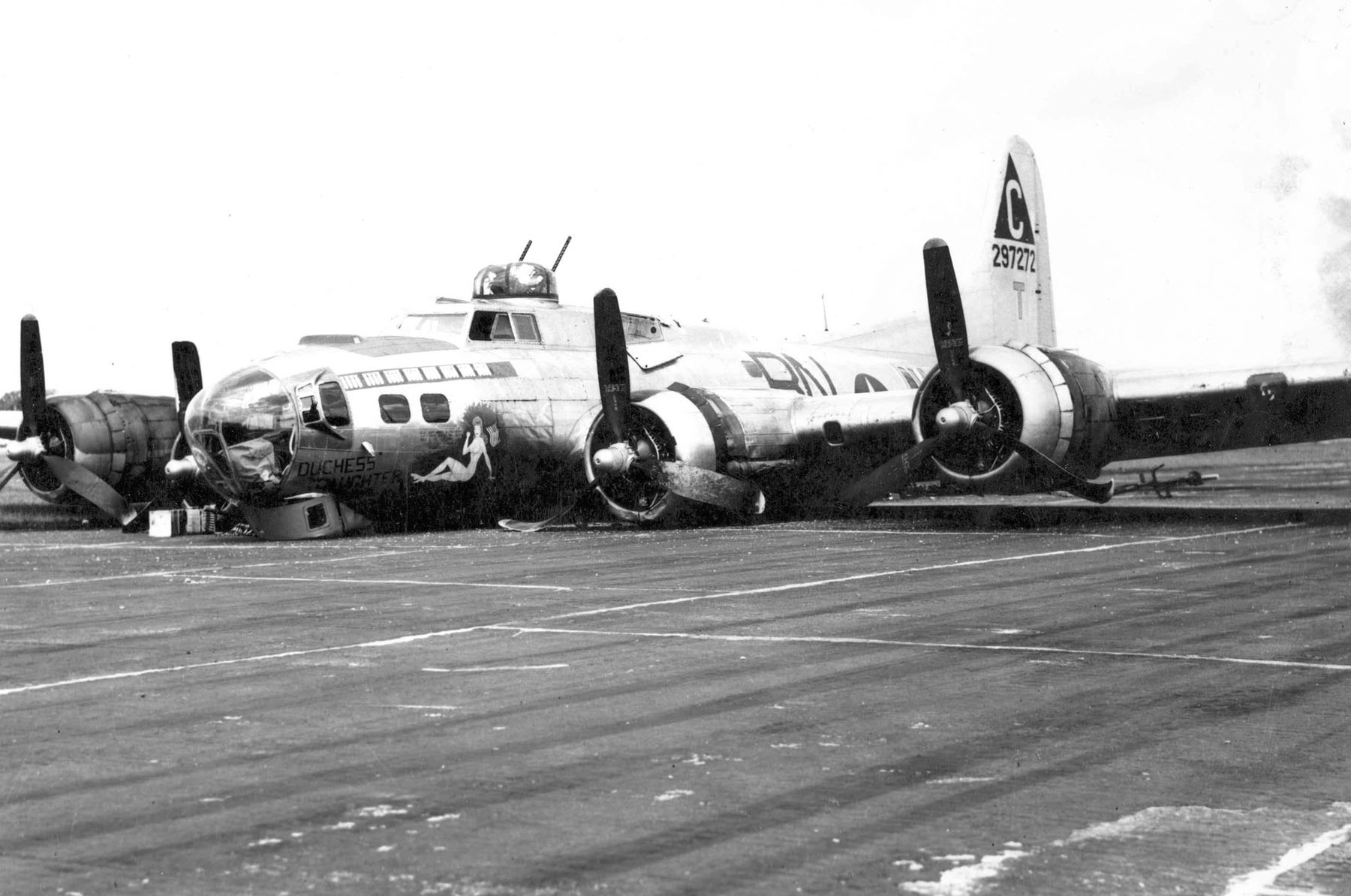
Lt Mathis' B-17 after the mission of 18 March 1943 (Note: Aircraft is Boeing B-17G-45-BO Flying Fortress serial 97272, fuselage code BN-T, nicknamed the Duchess. The plane made an emergency wheels up landing upon its return.)

Flying through intense flak on a mission against Bremen-Vegesack on 18 March 1943, in which bombing was to be done by squadrons, 1st Lieutenant Jack W. Mathis, was bombardier on the lead aircraft of the 359th. Less than a minute before bomb release, he was knocked nine feet back from his bombsight. Although Lt Mathis was mortally wounded, he returned to his position to release his bombs and ensure the squadron struck its target, dying as he toggled the bomb release. For this action, Lt Mathis was awarded the Medal of Honor

The 359th received a Distinguished Unit Citation when adverse weather on 11 January 1944 prevented its fighter cover from joining the group, exposing it to continuous attacks by Luftwaffe fighters. Despite this opposition, the unit successfully struck an aircraft assembly plant at Oschersleben.

Although a strategic bombing unit, the squadron was diverted on occasion to close air support and interdiction for ground forces. It attacked gun emplacements and bridges in the Pas-de-Calais during Operation Overlord, the invasion of Normandy, in June 1944; bombed enemy troops during Operation Cobra, the breakout at Saint Lo, and during the Battle of the Bulge. It bombed military installations near Wesel during Operation Lumberjack, the Allied assault across the Rhine. Its last combat mission was an attack on 25 April 1945 against an armament factory at Pilsen (now Plzeň).

Following VE Day in May 1945 the 303d Group was reassigned to the North African Division, Air Transport Command and moved to Casablanca Airfield, French Morocco to use its B-17 bombers as transports, ferrying personnel from France to Morocco. However, the two B-17 groups moved to Casablanca proved surplus to Air Transport Command's needs and the squadron was inactivated in late July 1945 and its planes ferried back to the United States.

=== Strategic Air Command ===
The squadron was activated in July 1947 at Andrews Field, Maryland, but was not manned or equipped and inactivated in September 1948. It was activated again at Davis–Monthan Air Force Base, Arizona in September 1951 and equipped with Boeing B-29 Superfortress bombers. Under a plan implemented in February 1951, wing commanders focused primarily on the combat units and the maintenance necessary to support combat aircraft by having the combat and maintenance squadrons report directly to the wing. Under this plan, the squadron was assigned to the 303rd Bombardment Group, but it was attached to the 303d Bombardment Wing. In June 1952, the intermediate group structures were eliminated, and the squadron was assigned directly to the wing. From 5 October to 6 November 1952, the squadron deployed with its B-29s to Sidi Slimane Air Base, Morocco.

The squadron upgraded to Boeing B-47 Stratojets in April 1953 when it received the first production block of B-47Es. It deployed to England with the 303d Bombardment Wing, to RAF Greenham Common from 4 March to 28 April 1954, then moving to RAF Fairford until 5 June. It deployed twice with the wing to Andersen Air Force Base, Guam from 4 July to 4 October 1956 and from 5 April to 5 July 1958.

From 1958, the B-47 wings of Strategic Air Command (SAC) began to assume an alert posture at their home bases, reducing the amount of time spent on alert at overseas bases. General Thomas S. Power set an initial goal of maintaining one third of SAC's planes on fifteen minute ground alert, fully fueled and ready for combat to reduce vulnerability to a Soviet missile strike. The SAC alert commitment was increased to half the squadron's aircraft in 1962.

Soon after the detection of Soviet missiles in Cuba, on 22 October, the squadron dispersed its bombers. Most dispersal bases were civilian airfields with AF Reserve or Air National Guard units. Squadron aircraft were configured for execution of the Emergency War Order as soon as possible after dispersal. On 15 November 1/6 of the squadron's dispersed B-47s were recalled to Davis-Monthan. Its remaining B-47s were recalled on 24 November. On 27 November the squadron returned to normal alert posture.

The squadron inactivated in June 1964 with the phaseout of the B-47.

== Lineage ==
- Constituted as the 359th Bombardment Squadron (Heavy) on 28 January 1942

Activated on 3 February 1942
Redesignated 359th Bombardment Squadron, Heavy on 20 August 1943
Inactivated on 25 July 1945
Redesignated 359th Bombardment Squadron, Very Heavy on 11 June 1947
Activated on 1 July 1947
Inactivated on 6 September 1948
Redesignated 359th Bombardment Squadron, Medium on 27 August 1951
Activated on 4 September 1951
Inactivated on 15 June 1964

=== Assignments ===
- 303d Bombardment Group, 3 February 1942 – 25 July 1945
- 303d Bombardment Group, 1 July 1947 – 6 September 1948
- 303d Bombardment Group, 4 September 1951
- 303d Bombardment Wing, 16 June 1952 – 15 June 1964

=== Stations ===
- Pendleton Field, Oregon, 3 February 1942
- Gowen Field, Idaho, 13 March 13, 1942 (operated from Muroc Army Air Field, California, 28 May – c. 14 June 1942)
- Alamogordo Army Air Field, New Mexico, 18 June 1942
- Biggs Field, Texas, 7–22 August 1942
- RAF Molesworth (AAF-107), England, 12 September 1942
- Casablanca Airfield, French Morocco, c. 31 May – 25 July 1945
- Andrews Field (later Andrews Air Force Base, Maryland, 1 July 1947 – 6 September 1948
- Davis–Monthan Air Force Base, Arizona, 4 September 1951 – 15 June 1964

=== Aircraft ===
- Boeing B-17 Flying Fortress, 1942–1945
- Boeing B-29 Superfortress, 1951–1953
- Boeing B-47 Stratojet, 1953–1964

=== Awards and campaigns ===
Award streamer	Award	Dates	Notes
	Distinguished Unit Citation	11 January 1944 Germany	
	Air Force Outstanding Unit Award	1 January 1961–31 March 1962	

Campaign Streamer	Campaign	Dates	Notes
	Antisubmarine	3 February 1942 – June 142	
	Air Offensive, Europe	12 September 1942 – 5 June 1944	
	Normandy	6 June 1944 – 24 July 1944	
	Northern France	25 July 1944 – 14 September 1944	
	Rhineland	15 September 1944 – 21 March 1945	
	Ardennes-Alsace	16 December 1944 – 25 January 1945	
	Central Europe	22 March 1944 – 21 May 1945	
	Air Combat, EAME Theater	12 September 1942 – 11 May 1945	

== See also ==
- B-17 Flying Fortress units of the United States Army Air Forces
- List of B-47 units of the United States Air Force
