= Shaud =

Shaud is a surname. Notable people with the surname include:

- Grant Shaud (born 1961), American actor
- John A. Shaud (1933–2026), United States Air Force four-star general
