= 303rd Air Expeditionary Group =

United States Air Force unit

303rd Air Expeditionary Group

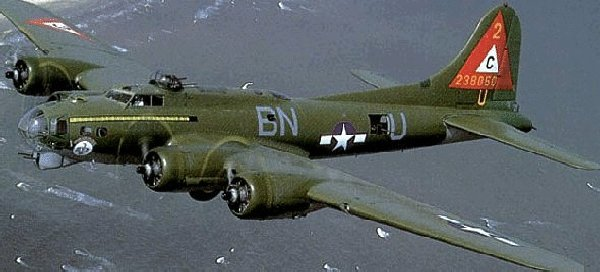
- Boeing B-17G of the 303rd Bombardment Group showing Triangle C tail markings
- Active: 1942–1945; 1947–1948; 1951–1952; 2004–2010
- Country: United States
- Branch: United States Air Force
- Role: Bombardment
- Part of: United States Air Forces Europe
- Nickname: Hell's Angels
- Motto: Might in Flight
- Engagements: European Theater of World War II
- Decorations: Distinguished Unit Citation

Insignia
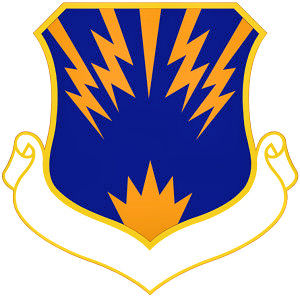
- 303rd Air Expeditionary Group emblem

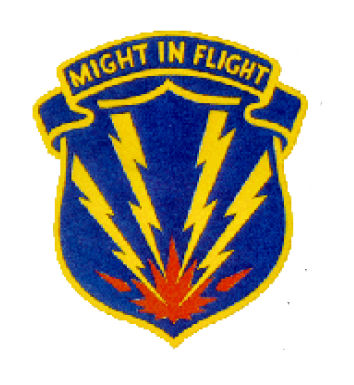
- 303rd Bombardment Group emblem as usually displayed during World War II

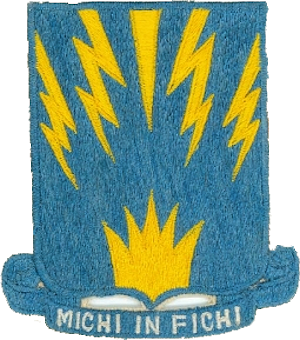
- 303rd Bombardment Group arms as approved 9 January 1943
- Eighth Air Force Tail Marking: Triangle C

The 303rd Air Expeditionary Group is a provisional United States Air Force unit. In 2011, it was assigned to United States Air Forces Europe to activate or inactivate as needed.

The unit was first activated as the 303rd Bombardment Group in February 1942. During World War II, the 303rd was one of the first VIII Bomber Command B-17 Flying Fortress units in England. The group's "Hell's Angels" is recognized by the USAF as the first B-17 to complete 25 combat missions in the ETO on 13 May 1943, six days before the Memphis Belle, though 12 days after Delta Rebel 2. The group went on to fly more than 300 combat missions, more than any other B-17 group in the theater. The B-17 "Knock-out Dropper" was the first aircraft in Eighth Air Force to complete 50, then 75 missions. The group was awarded the Distinguished Unit Citation for completing an attack against a heavily defended target in January 1944.

The group was twice activated for brief periods by Strategic Air Command (SAC). During the first of these periods, from July 1947 to September 1948, the group was not equipped or manned. It was again activated at Davis-Monthan Air Force Base, Arizona in September 1951. However, SAC reorganized its combat wings to assign operational squadrons directly to the wing headquarters in June 1952 and the group was again inactivated.

Air Force Materiel Command activated the Global Hawk Systems Group in January 2005 during a reorganization called the Air Force Materiel Command Transformation to manage the acquisition and development of the Northrop Grumman RQ-4 Global Hawk. This group was consolidated with the 303rd as the 303rd Aeronautical Systems Group in June 2006. The consolidated group was inactivated in June 2010, when AF Materiel Command returned to its traditional directorate systems management organization.

== History ==
=== Creation ===
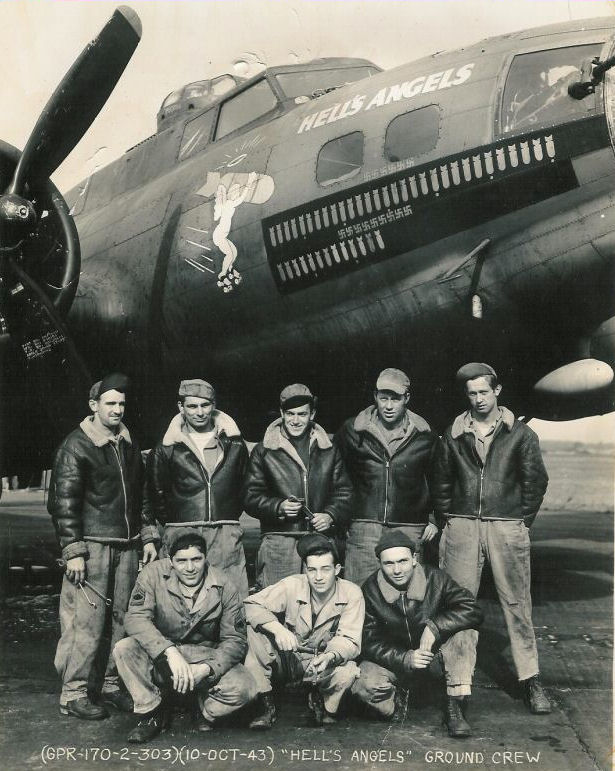
Aircraft and ground crew of B-17 "Hell's Angels" at RAF Molesworth (Note: The aircraft, serial 41-24577, of the 358th Bombardment Squadron became the first B-17 to complete 25 combat missions with Eighth Air Force on 13 May 1943)

The 303rd Bombardment Group was activated in February 1942 as a Boeing B-17 Flying Fortress heavy bomber group at Pendleton Field, Oregon, and assigned the 358th, 359th, and 360th Bombardment Squadrons and the 31st Reconnaissance Squadron. It moved to Gowen Field, Idaho, where its 31st Reconnaissance Squadron was replaced by the 38th Reconnaissance Squadron, which had lost most of its B-17s in the attack on Pearl Harbor. The group deployed to Southern California to fly antisubmarine patrols over the Pacific. The group completed training in the southwest by August 1942. The ground echelon departed Biggs Field, Texas in August 1942, arriving at Fort Dix on August 24. It sailed aboard the RMS Queen Mary and arrived in Great Britain on 10 September. The air echelon flew through Kellogg Field, Michigan, and Dow Field, Maine before ferrying its planes across the Atlantic.

=== Air war in Europe ===
Due to the haste to move heavy bombers to Europe, the group was insufficiently trained for combat and it continued to train in England until its first combat mission on November 17, 1942 in a strike against German submarines at Saint-Nazaire. The 303rd returned having been unable to locate its target. It attacked Saint-Nazaire the following day, although its intended target was La Pallice. Its initial raids were on airfields, railroads and submarine pens in France. As one of only four Flying Fortress groups in VIII Bomber Command during late 1942 and early 1943, the 303rd participated in the development of the tactics that would be used throughout the air campaign against Germany. (Note: see Freeman, Chapter 3, "The Pioneers", pp. 21–32 describing development of formations, bombing techniques, etc. during this period)

In 1943, the group began flying missions to Germany, participating in the first attack by American heavy bombers on a target in Germany, a raid on the submarine yards at Wilhelmshaven on 27 January 1943. From that time, it concentrated primarily on strategic bombardment of German industry, marshalling yards, and other strategic targets, including the ball bearing plants at Schweinfurt, shipyards at Bremen and an aircraft engine factory at Hamburg.

The 303rd received a Distinguished Unit Citation when adverse weather on 11 January 1944 prevented its fighter cover from joining the group, exposing it to continuous attacks by Luftwaffe fighters. Despite this opposition, the unit successfully struck an aircraft assembly plant at Oschersleben.

Although a strategic bombing unit, the squadron was, as with other heavy bomber squadrons, used in close air support and interdiction for ground forces. It attacked gun emplacements and bridges in the Pas-de-Calais during Operation Overlord, the invasion of Normandy, in June 1944. This was followed by bombing enemy troops during Operation Cobra, the US breakout at Saint Lo, and during the Battle of the Bulge. It bombed military installations near Wesel in March 1945 in support of the First United States Army Operation Lumberjack to cross the Rhine. Its last combat mission was an attack on 25 April 1945 against an armament factory at Pilsen (now Plzeň).

Following VE Day in May 1945, the 303rd Group was reassigned to the North African Division, Air Transport Command and moved to Casablanca Airfield, French Morocco to use its B-17 bombers as transports, ferrying personnel from France to Morocco. However, the two B-17 groups moved to Casablanca proved surplus to Air Transport Command's needs and the squadron was inactivated in late July 1945 and its planes ferried back to the United States.

During the War, the 303rd flew 364 missions, more than any other Eighth Air Force B-17 group, and one group Fort, "Hell's Angels", was the first to complete 25 missions, while another, "Knock Out Dropper", was the first to complete 50 and 75 missions. Only one other group delivered more bomb tonnage than the 303rd. However, the group lost 165 planes, more than five times its authorized strength of 30 B-17s.

=== Capture of "Wulfe Hound" ===
A B-17F from the group's 360th Bombardment Squadron, nicknamed Wulfe Hound, (Note: a B-17F-27-BO serial 41-24585, fuselage code 'PU-B') was the first Flying Fortress to be captured by the Luftwaffe. On 12 December 1942 (the group's sixth mission, after attacking railroad marshaling yards in the Sotteville-lès-Rouen area of France, The B-17 was damaged by Focke-Wulf Fw 190 fighters. The damage forced the pilot, First Lieutenant Paul F. Flickenger to make a wheels-up landing in a hayfield near Melun (60 miles southeast of Paris), with the ball turret guns pointing downward. Eight of the crew were captured but Lieutenants Gilbert T. Schowalter (navigator) and Jack E. Williams (co-pilot), along with Sgt. Norman P. Therrien (right waist gunner), T/Sgt Frederick A. Hartung, Jr. (left waist gunner), S/Sgt Iva Lee Fegette (radio operator), and T/Sgt. William A. "Whit" Whitman (engineer) were able to escape and evade.

Luftwaffe personnel transported the plane to the Leeuwarden Airfield in the Netherlands, where repairs were made and the B-17 put in flyable condition. The damaged ball turret was never repaired. It was painted with German Balkenkreuz and assigned Stammkennzeichen alphabetic code DL+XC with yellow paint on the undersurfaces. It was carefully examined and tested at the Luftwaffe Test and Evaluation Center at Rechlin-Lärz Airfield. The B-17 was first flown by the Germans on 17 March 1943, followed by more testing and development of fighter tactics against B-17s.

The plane was then transferred to Kampfgeschwader 200 special operations wing at Rangsdorf, Germany, on 11 September 1943. It then took part in training and highly secretive clandestine missions between May and June 1944. On 20 April 1945, the aircraft was caught in an American air-raid on Oranienburg Airfield and was partially destroyed.

In 2000, the German government started redeveloping the former airfield, and parts of Wulfe Hound were rediscovered and placed on display at the Sachsenhausen Memorial Store.

=== Strategic Air Command ===
The group was activated at Andrews Field, Maryland on 1 July 1947 and assigned to Strategic Air Command (SAC). However, the 303rd was not manned or equipped before it was inactivated in September 1948.

The 303rd was again activated by SAC at Davis-Monthan Air Force Base, Arizona in September 1951. However, the group did not become operational because SAC was testing the "Dual Deputate" organization, (Note: Under this plan flying [and missile] squadrons reported to the wing Deputy Commander for Operations and maintenance squadrons reported to the wing Deputy Commander for Maintenance) and its squadrons were managed by its parent 303rd Bombardment Wing. In June 1952 its squadrons were assigned directly to the wing and the group was inactivated.

=== Air Force Materiel Command ===
Prior to 2005, Program Executive Officers (PEO)s managing Air Force systems were generally located in Washington. Program managers in field units reported to the PEO for each program. As a result of a study begun in 2003 the Air Force decided to consolidate PEOs and locate them at the Air Force Materiel Command (AFMC) centers. The reorganization was known as the Air Force Materiel Command Transformation. In conjunction with the new organization, the traditional center directorates were replaced by wings and groups. The Global Hawk Systems Group was formed as one of the new groups at Wright-Patterson Air Force Base, Ohio in January 2005. During the summer of 2006 the 303rd was consolidated with this group and the consolidated unit was shortly renamed the 303rd Aeronautical Systems Group.

The group managed the Northrop Grumman RQ-4 Global Hawk unmanned reconnaissance vehicle while it was simultaneously being manufactured and modified to increase its mission capability. The Global Hawk was operational and required logistic sustainment at the same time it was undergoing test and evaluation. The group also assisted the United States Navy with procurement of its first Global Hawk vehicles.

After analyzing the results of that reorganization, the Air Force decided PEOs that were even closer to the persons managing programs on a day-to-day basis would improve the system. It announced the Air Force Acquisition Improvement Plan in May 2009 and four months later announced the initiative would include a return to the Directorate organizational model. In June 2010, the group was inactivated.

=== Expeditionary unit ===
In March 2011, the group was converted to provisional status as the 303rd Air Expeditionary Group and assigned to United States Air Forces Europe, which may activate or inactivate it when needed for contingency operations.

== Lineage ==
303rd Air Expeditionary Group

- Constituted as the 303rd Bombardment Group (Heavy) on 28 January 1942, Activated on 3 February 1942, Redesignated 303rd Bombardment Group, Heavy on 20 August 1943. Inactivated on 25 July 1945
- Redesignated 303rd Bombardment Group, Very Heavy on 1 July 1947. Activated on 1 July 1947. Inactivated on 6 September 1948
- Redesignated 303rd Bombardment Group, Medium on 4 September 1951. Activated on 4 September 1951. Inactivated on 16 June 1952
- Consolidated with the Global Hawk Systems Group as the Global Hawk Systems Group on 23 June 2006
- Redesignated 303rd Aeronautical Systems Group on 14 July 2006. Inactivated on 30 June 2010
- Converted to provisional status, redesignated 303rd Air Expeditionary Group and assigned to United States Air Forces Europe to activate or inactivate as needed on 8 March 2011

Global Hawk Systems Group

- Constituted on as the Global Hawk Systems Group on 23 November 2004. Activated on 18 January 2005
- Consolidated with the 303rd Bombardment Group on 23 June 2006

=== Assignments ===
- Second Air Force, 3 February 1942 – 28 August 1942
- 1st Bombardment Wing, 10 Sep 1942
- 41st Combat Bombardment Wing, 13 September 1943
- North African Division, Air Transport Command, 15 June – 25 July 1945
- Strategic Air Command, 1 July 1947 – 6 September 1948
- 303rd Bombardment Wing, 4 September 1951 – 16 June 1952
- Reconnaissance Systems Wing (later 303rd Aeronautical Systems Wing). 18 January 2005 – 30 June 2010
- United States Air Force Europe, to activate or inactivate as needed, 8 March 2011

=== Components ===
- 31st Reconnaissance Squadron (Heavy), 3 February-16 March 1942
- 38th Reconnaissance Squadron (later 427th Bombardment Squadron), attached 13 March 1942, assigned 31 March 1942 – 25 July 1945
- 303rd Air Refueling Squadron, 4 September 1951 – 8 April 1952
- 358th Bombardment Squadron, 3 February 1942 – 25 July 1945; 1 July 1947 – 6 September 1948; 4 September 1951 – 16 June 1952
- 359th Bombardment Squadron, 3 February 1942 – 25 July 1945; 1 July 1947 – 6 September 1948; 4 September 1951 – 16 June 1952
- 360th Bombardment Squadron, 3 February 1942 – 25 July 1945; 1 July 1947 – 6 September 1948; 4 September 1951 – 16 June 1952
- 669th Aeronautical Systems Squadron, 14 July 2006 – 30 June 2008

=== Stations ===
- Pendleton Field, Oregon, 3 February 1942
- Gowen Field, Idaho, 11 February 1942
- Alamogordo Army Air Field, New Mexico, 12 June 1942
- Biggs Field, Texas, 7–23 August 1942
- RAF Molesworth (USAAF Station 107), England, 12 September 1942
- Casablanca Airfield, French Morocco, C. 31 May – 25 July 1945
- Andrews Field (later Andrews Air Force Base), Maryland, 4 July 1947 – 6 September 1948
- Davis-Monthan Air Force Base, Arizona, 4 September 1951 – 16 June 1952
- Wright-Patterson Air Force Base, Ohio, 18 January 2005 – 30 June 2010

=== Aircraft assigned ===
- Boeing B-17 Flying Fortress, 1942–1945
- Boeing B-29 Superfortress, 1951–1952

== See also ==
- B-17 Flying Fortress units of the United States Army Air Forces
- List of B-29 Superfortress operators
