= 87th Tactical Missile Squadron =

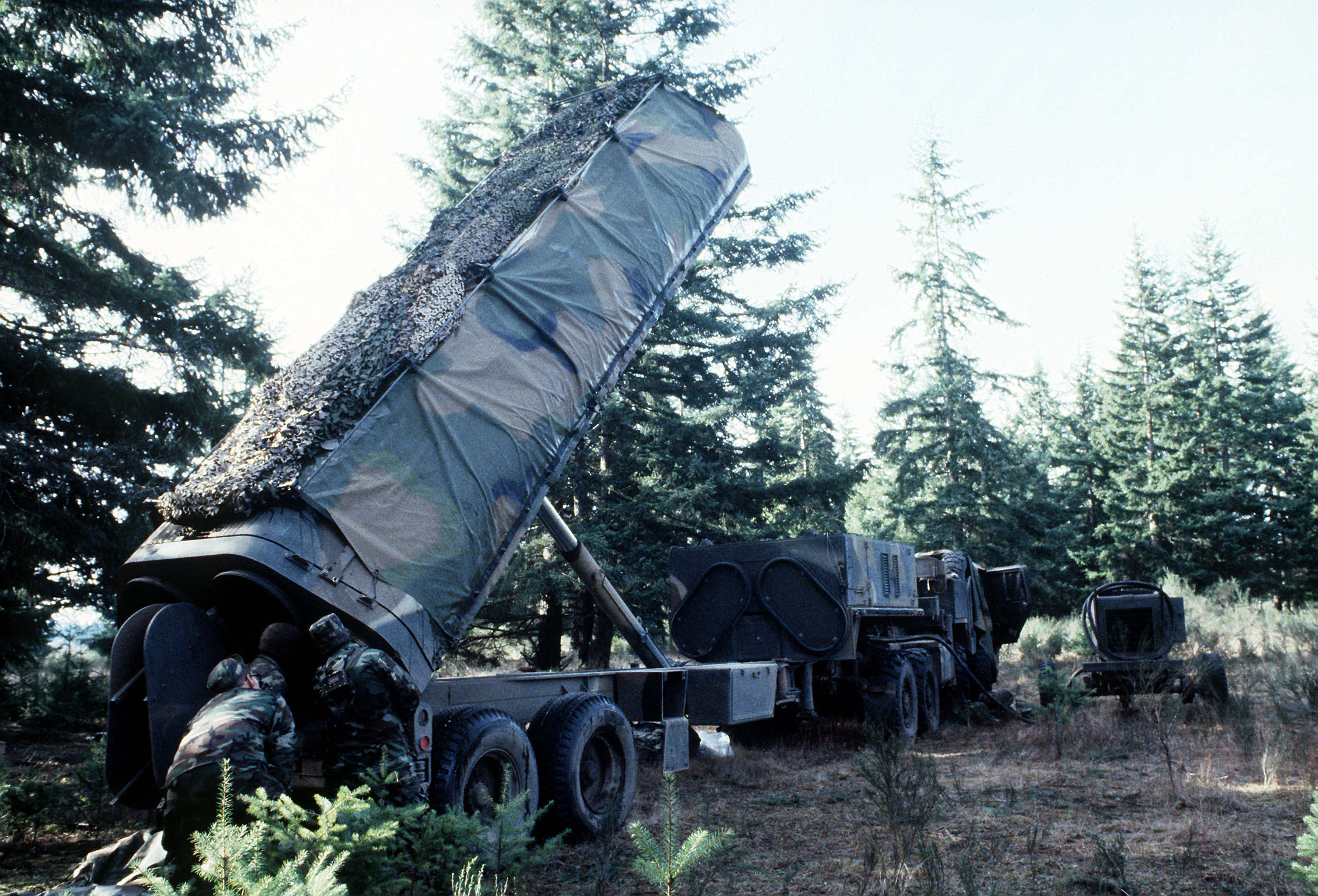
- deployed BGM-109G Gryphon launcher
- Active: 1941–1944; 1962–1966; 1986–1989
- Country: United States
- Branch: United States Air Force
- Role: cruise missile
- Engagements: Antisubmarine Campaign
- Decorations: Air Force Outstanding Unit Award

Insignia
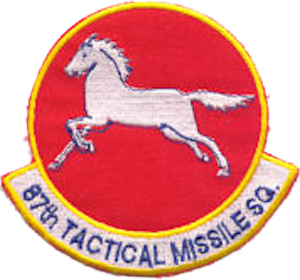
- 87th Tactical Missile Squadron Emblem

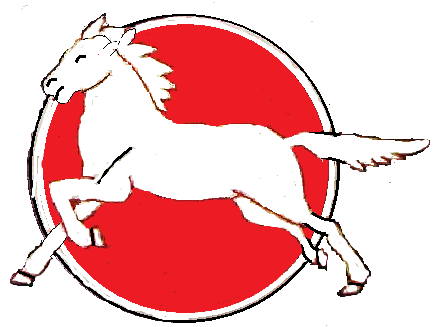
- 87th Bombardment Squadron emblem (approved 26 August 1942)

The 87th Tactical Missile Squadron is an inactive squadron of the United States Air Force last based at RAF Molesworth, England. The squadron was originally activated as the 8th Reconnaissance Squadron. The unit served on antisubmarine patrol early in World War II, then as a training unit until it was disbanded in 1944.

The 887th Tactical Missile Squadron was active as a Mace missile unit in Germany from 1962 to 1966.

In September 1985 the two squadrons were consolidated. However, the consolidated squadron remained inactive until August 1986. In that month it was reactivated as a BGM-109G Gryphon cruise missile squadron in the United Kingdom. It was inactivated in January 1989 as required by the Intermediate-Range Nuclear Forces Treaty.

== History ==
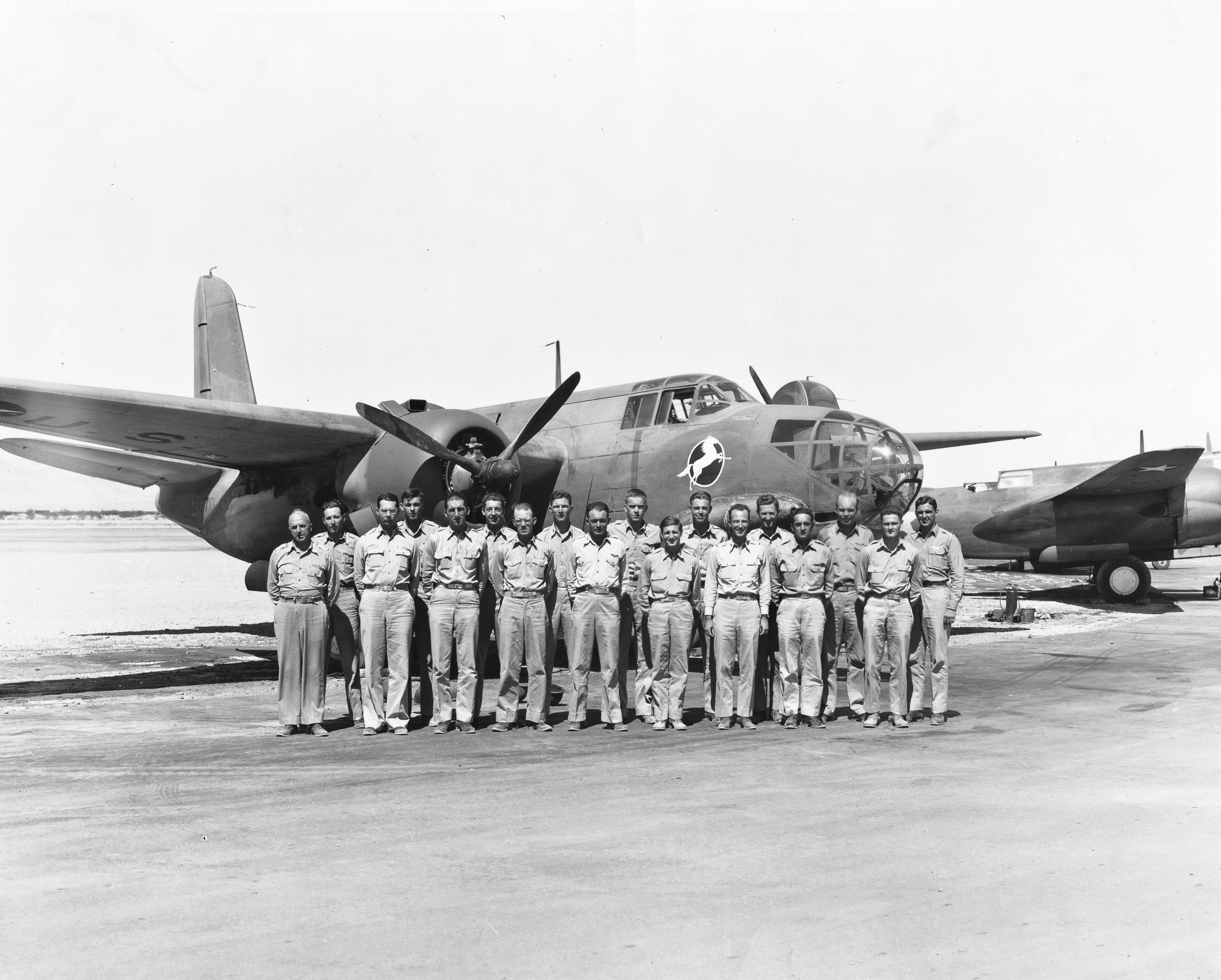
Douglas A-20 of the 46th Bombardment Group at Blythe Army Air Field

=== World War II ===
The squadron was first activated as the 8th Reconnaissance Squadron (Light) in early 1941. It was one of the four original squadrons of the 46th Bombardment Group. In August the squadron changed its role to bombardment and was redesignated the 87th Bombardment Squadron. The 87th was equipped with Douglas A-20 Havoc aircraft at Hunter Field, Georgia. The 51st participated in maneuvers, including desert maneuvers, and flew anti-submarine warfare patrol and search missions over the Gulf of Mexico in early 1942.

The squadron later served as an operational training unit, which involved the use of an oversized parent unit to provide cadres for "satellite groups." In late 1943 the squadron mission changed to replacement training of individual pilots and aircrews. Just before disbanding, it began to convert to North American B-25 Mitchells.

However, the Army Air Forces found that standard military units, based on relatively inflexible tables of organization were proving less well adapted to the training mission. Accordingly, a more functional system was adopted in which each base was organized into a separate numbered unit. This resulted in the squadron, along with other units at Morris Field, being disbanded and its personnel, equipment and functions transferred to the 333d AAF Base Unit (Replacement Training Unit, Light Bombardment).

=== 887th Tactical Missile Squadron ===
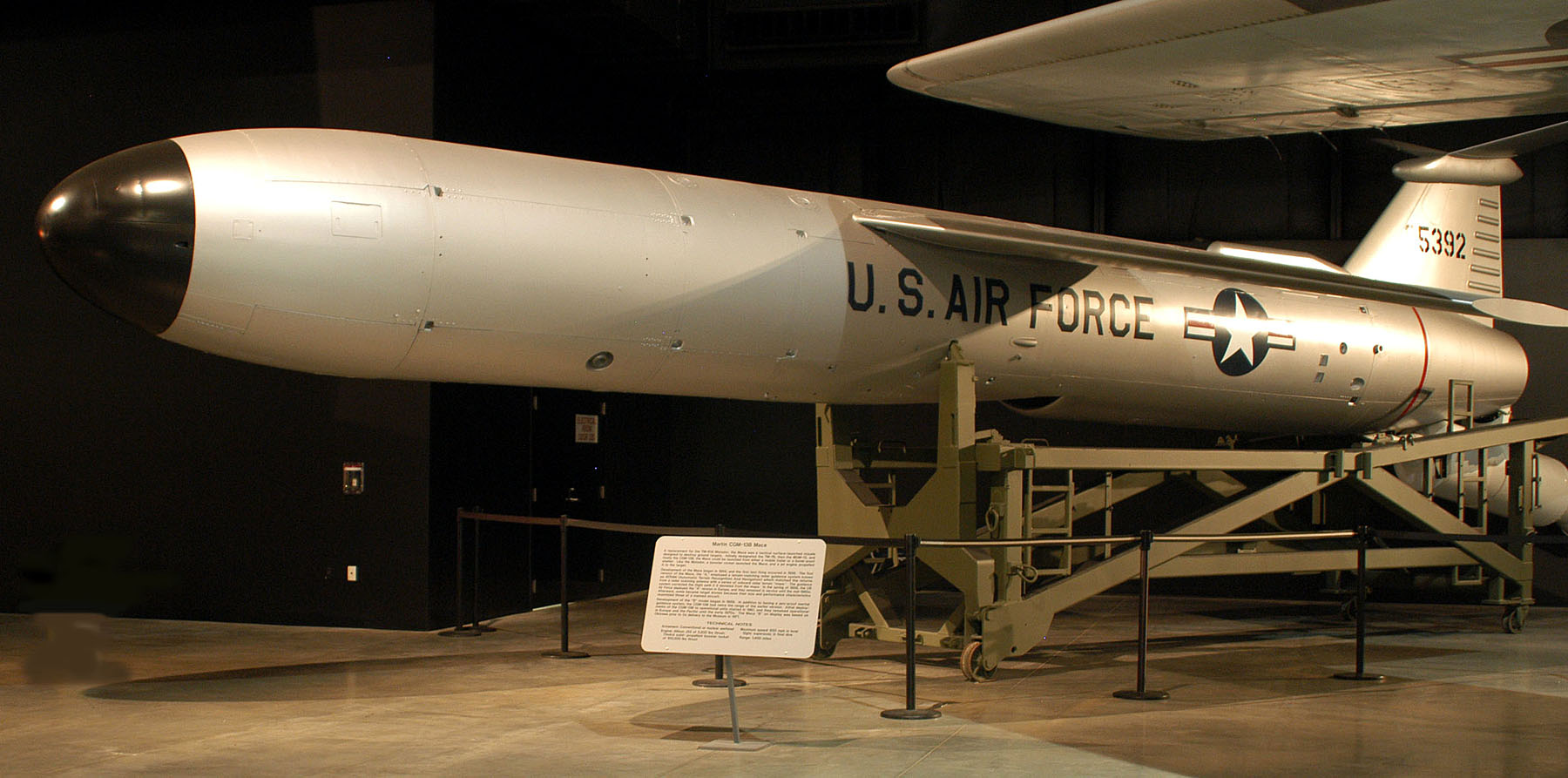
CGM-13 Mace tactical missile

The 887th Tactical Missile Squadron was organized in September 1962 at Sembach AB, Germany and assigned to the 38th Tactical Missile Wing. At Sembach the squadron operated the TM-76A Mace missile from Site III "Hacksaw" – 12.5 miles (20.1 km) ENE of Sembach AB 49°33′27″N 008°08′05″E.

The squadron was discontinued and inactivated on 25 September 1966 along with its parent wing as United States Air Forces Europe reduced its tactical missile force.

From 1975 – 1978, Site III "Hacksaw" was used by Det B, 502nd Army Security Agency (ASA) Bn for the Guardrail I, II, and IIa Integrated Processing Facility (IPF) site. The unit was redesignated as the 330th Electronic Warfare Aviation Company (Forward) (330th EW Avn Co (FWD)), and resubordinated to the 2nd Military Intelligence Battalion (Aerial Exploitation) in 1978. It appears that this unit used the RC-12 Guardrail aircraft.

From 1979 – 1985, Site III "Hacksaw" was upgraded to the Guardrail V (GRV) IPF, and in the fall of 1985 the unit moved to Echterdingen Army Airfield (Stuttgart International Airport). The site was subsequently used by various and sundry communications units on deployment before being closed and turned over to the German government.

In September 1985, the 887th TMS was consolidated with the 87th Bombardment Squadron but it remained inactive.

=== Ground Launched Cruise Missile ===
The consolidated squadron was redesignated 87th Tactical Missile Squadron and reactivated at RAF Molesworth as a BGM-109G Gryphon cruise missile squadron in August 1986. It maintained 64 operational cruise missiles at combat readiness. The squadron was inactivated in January 1989 as a result of the Intermediate-Range Nuclear Forces Treaty which resulted in the elimination of the BGM-109G missile from service.

== Lineage ==
87th Bombardment Squadron

- Constituted as the 8th Reconnaissance Squadron (Light) on 20 November 1940

Activated on 15 January 1941
Redesignated 87th Bombardment Squadron (Light) on 14 August 1941
Disbanded on 1 May 1944

- Reconstituted on 19 September 1985 and consolidated with the 887th Tactical Missile Squadron as the 887th Tactical Missile Squadron

887th Tactical Missile Squadron

- Constituted 10 September 1962 as the 887th Tactical Missile Squadron and activated (not organized)
- Organized on 25 September 1962
- Discontinued and inactivated 25 September 1966
- Consolidated with the 87th Bombardment Squadron on 10 September 1985 (remained inactive)

87th Tactical Missile Squadron

Redesignated 87th Tactical Missile Squadron
Activated on 12 December 1986
Inactivated on 31 January 1989

=== Assignments ===
- 46th Bombardment Group: 15 January 1941 – 1 May 1944
- United States Air Forces Europe: 10 September 1962 (not organized)
- 38th Tactical Missile Wing: 25 September 1962 – 25 September 1966
- 303d Tactical Missile Wing: 12 December 1986 – 31 January 1989

=== Stations ===
- Hunter Field, Georgia, 15 January 1941
- Bowman Field, Kentucky, 22 May 1941
- Barksdale Field, Louisiana, 2 February 1942
- Galveston Municipal Airport, Texas, 1 April 1942
- Blythe Army Air Base, California, 22 May 1942
- Will Rogers Field, Oklahoma, 11 November 1942
- Drew Field, Florida, 6 October 1943
- Morris Field, North Carolina, 5 November 1943 – 1 May 1944
- Sembach AB, Germany 25 September 1962 – 25 September 1966

Mace missile site (Site III "Hacksaw") located at 12.5 miles (20.1 km) ENE of Sembach AB 49°33′27″N 008°08′05″E. This site was later used by the Army Security Agency as an intelligence processing facility from 1975 to 1985.

- RAF Molesworth, England, 12 December 1986 – 31 January 1989

BGM-109G Missile site located at 52°22′55″N 000°25′41″W

=== Aircraft and Missiles ===
- Douglas A-20 Havoc, 1941–1944
- North American B-25 Mitchell, 1944
- Martin TM-76A (later CGM-13A) Mace
- General Dynamics BGM-109G Gryphon, 1986–1989

=== Awards and campaigns ===
Award streamer	Award	Dates	Notes
	Air Force Outstanding Unit Award	1 June 1964 – 1 June 1966	887th Tactical Missile Squadron
	Air Force Outstanding Unit Award	12 December 1986 – 31 July 1988	87th Tactical Missile Squadron

Campaign Streamer	Campaign	Dates	Notes
	Antisubmarine		
