= John A. Shaud =

United States Air Force general (1933–2026)

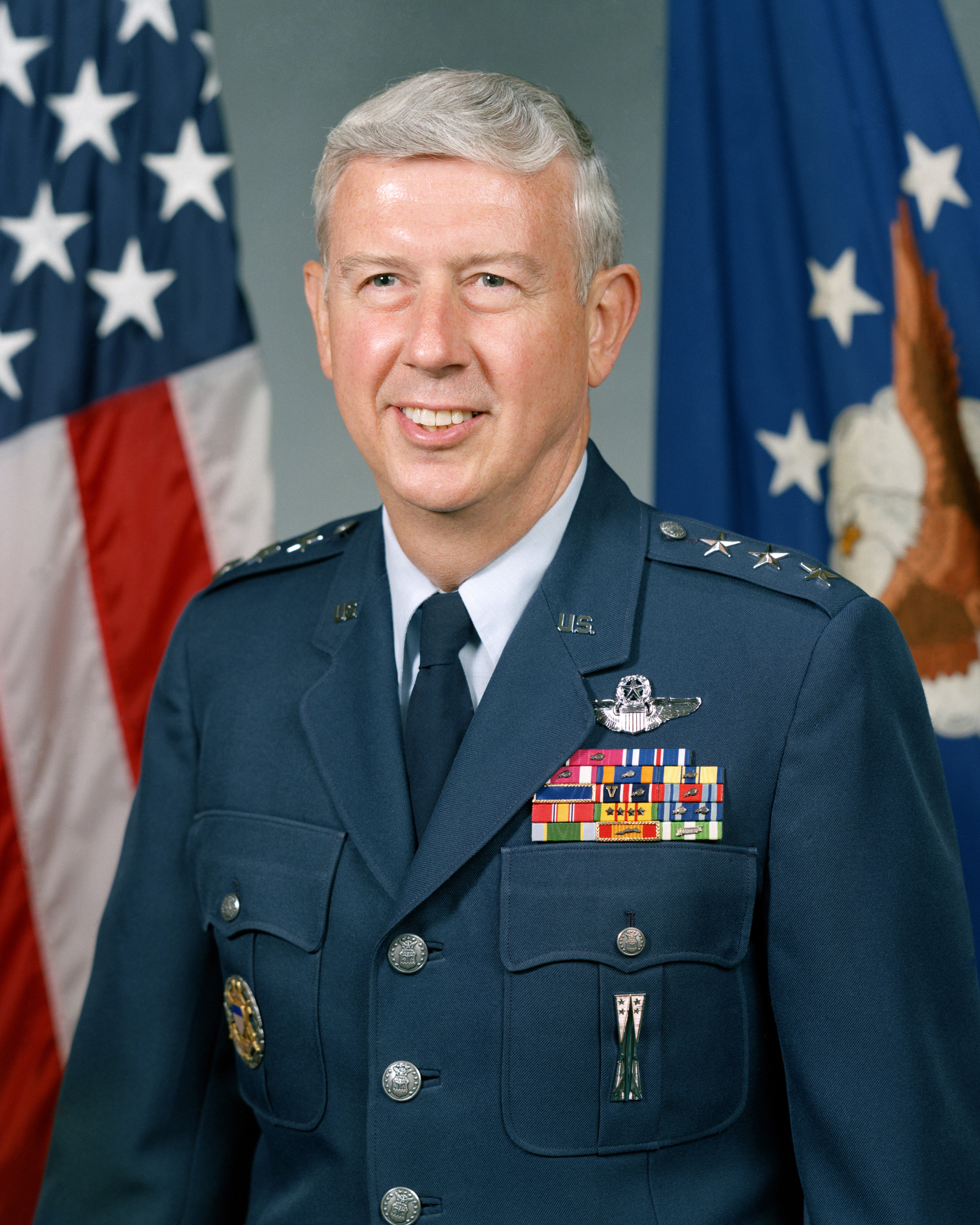
- Born: December 15, 1933; Cleveland, Ohio, U.S.
- Died: March 13, 2026 (aged 92); McLean, Virginia, U.S.
- Military career
- Allegiance: United States of America
- Branch: United States Air Force
- Rank: General

General John Albert Shaud (December 15, 1933 – March 13, 2026) was a United States Air Force four-star general who served as Chief of Staff, Supreme Headquarters Allied Powers Europe (COFS SHAPE) from 1988 to 1991.

== Life and career ==
Shaud was born in Cleveland, Ohio, on December 15, 1933, where he graduated from Cleveland Heights High School. He attended Lafayette College for a year prior to entering the United States Military Academy. Upon graduation from West Point in 1956, he received a Bachelor of Science degree and was commissioned as a second lieutenant in the Air Force. He received a Master of Science degree from The George Washington University in 1967 and a doctorate from Ohio State University in 1971. Shaud completed Squadron Officer School in 1962, Air Command and Staff College in 1967, and the National War College in 1974.

He received pilot wings upon graduation from training in August 1957. In December 1957, he was assigned to the 358th Bombardment Squadron, Davis-Monthan Air Force Base, Arizona, as a B-47 pilot. After completing B-52 combat crew training in May 1964, he was assigned to Wright-Patterson Air Force Base, Ohio, as an aircraft commander with the 17th Bombardment Wing.

Upon graduation from Air Command and Staff College in June 1967, Shaud completed RF-4C qualification training and was assigned to the Southeast Asia theater of operations in January 1968. He served on the operations staff of the 388th Tactical Fighter Wing at Korat Royal Thai Air Force Base, Thailand, and later became an RF-4C flight commander with the 12th Tactical Reconnaissance Squadron at Tan Son Nhut Air Base, South Vietnam.

He returned to the United States and attended Ohio State University, where he received his doctorate in June 1971. He then was assigned to Maxwell Air Force Base, Alabama, and served on the faculty of the Air Command and Staff College until entering the National War College in August 1973. After graduating in June 1974, the general was assigned to the 449th Bombardment Wing, Kincheloe Air Force Base, Michigan, as deputy commander for operations. In April 1975, he became vice commander of the wing.

In January 1976, he was assigned to the Office of the Deputy Chief of Staff, Plans and Operations, Headquarters U.S. Air Force, Washington, D.C. During this tour of duty he served as chief, Strategic Division; deputy chief, Air Force Readiness Initiatives Group; and assistant deputy director for readiness development. In June 1978, Shaud assumed command of the 92nd Bombardment Wing (Heavy) and, later, of the 47th Air Division, both at Fairchild Air Force Base, Washington.

Shaud transferred to Minot Air Force Base, North Dakota, in August 1980 as commander of the 57th Air Division. As part of his responsibility, he performed special missions as commander of the strategic projection force when directed by the commander in chief of Strategic Air Command.

In October 1981, Shaud returned to Air Force headquarters, where he served as deputy director of plans and, later, director of plans in the Office of the Deputy Chief of Staff, Plans and Operations. He remained at the Pentagon as deputy chief of staff for personnel from September 1985 to August 1986. He then became commander of Air Training Command with headquarters at Randolph Air Force Base, Texas. The command is responsible for recruiting Air Force personnel and providing their military, technical and flying training. He became Chief of Staff, Supreme Headquarters Allied Powers Europe in July 1988.

A command pilot with more than 5,600 flying hours, Shaud has flown in more than 35 different types of aircraft, including the B-47, B-52, RF-4C, T-38 and C-21A, and has logged 251 combat hours in the RF-4C. His military decorations include the Air Force Distinguished Service Medal, Legion of Merit with oak leaf cluster, Distinguished Flying Cross, Meritorious Service Medal with oak leaf cluster, Air Medal with five oak leaf clusters, and Air Force Commendation Medal with oak leaf cluster.

Shaud was promoted to general July 1, 1988, with same date of rank and retired from the Air Force on June 30, 1991. He died from complications of a stroke in McLean, Virginia, on March 13, 2026, at the age of 92. He was interred at Arlington National Cemetery.
