= 303rd Aeronautical Systems Wing =

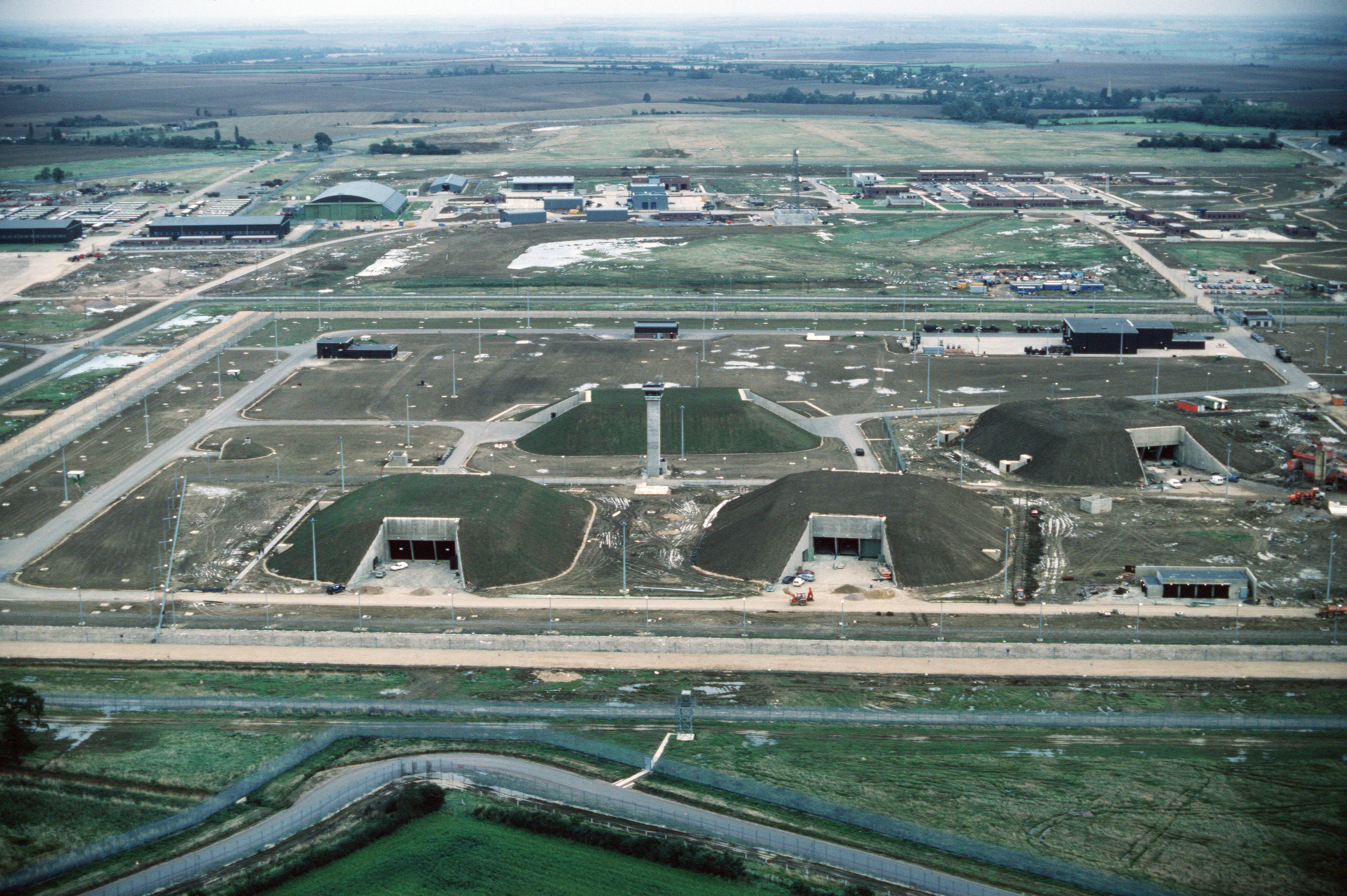
- Wing bunkers for cruise missiles at RAF Molesworth
- Active: 1951–1964; 1986–1989; 2005–2010
- Country: United States
- Branch: United States Air Force
- Role: Aeronautical systems

Insignia
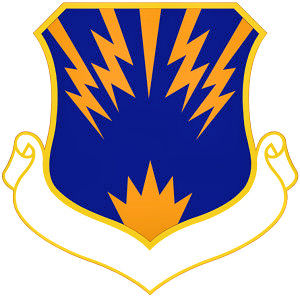
- 303rd Aeronautical Systems Wing emblem

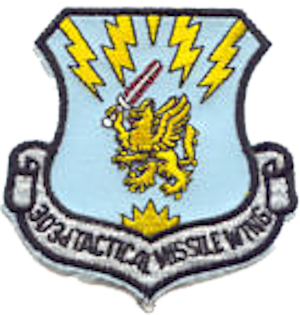
- Patch with 303d Tactical Missile Wing emblem

The 303rd Aeronautical Systems Wing is an inactive United States Air Force unit last assigned to the Air Force Materiel Command Aeronautical Systems Center, 2005–2010. It was stationed at Wright-Patterson Air Force Base in Ohio as a tenant unit.

The wing was first activated during the Cold War. It was organized by the Strategic Air Command as the 303rd Bombardment Wing, a Boeing B-47 Stratojet medium bomber wing in the 1950s and in the 1980s, became a tactical missile wing assigned to the United States Air Forces in Europe.

== History ==
Specifically trained for strategic bombardment and air refueling operations to meet the Strategic Air Command (SAC)'s global commitments and equipped with B-29 Superfortresses, the wing was deployed to Sidi Slimane Air Base, French Morocco on 5 October to 6th November 1952.

In 1953, the wing replaced its B-29s with Boeing B-47E Stratojet medium bombers. These swept-wing aircraft were capable of high subsonic speeds and were designed to penetrate Soviet airspace. It flew numerous training missions and participated in various SAC exercises and deployments with the Stratojet, deploying to RAF Greenham Common, England, 17/03/1954 – 28/04/1954; RAF Fairford, England, 28/04/1954 – 05/06/1954; and Anderson Air Force Base, Guam, 04/07/1956 - 04/10/1956 and 05/04/1958 - 05/07/1958.

In the early 1960s, the B-47 was considered to be reaching obsolescence, and was being phased out of the SAC's strategic arsenal. The wing began to send its Stratojets to the Aerospace Maintenance and Regeneration Center (AMARC) in 1963, the last being retired in 1964. It was inactivated on 15 June 1964 after the last B-47 was retired.

The wing was reactivated as a BGM-109G Gryphon cruise missile wing in August 1986. It maintained 64 operational missiles in a combat-ready state. The wing was finally inactivated in January 1989 as a result of the Intermediate-Range Nuclear Forces Treaty and the elimination of the BGM-109G missile from service.

As part of the Aeronautical Systems Center, the 303d designed, developed and delivered aerospace weapon systems and capabilities for the U.S. Air Force, as well as other U.S. military, allied, and coalition-partner war fighters, in support of Air Force leadership priorities.

Its responsibilities also included identifying, coordinating, and implementing horizontal integration/capability planning across weapons systems in support of the Global Strike and Global Persistent Attack concept of operations.

The wing was reorganized as a directorate on 1 July 2010.

=== Lineage ===
303d Bombardment Wing

- Established as the 303d Bombardment Wing, Medium on 27 August 1951

Activated on 4 September 1951
Discontinued and inactivated, on 15 June 1964
Re-designated 303d Tactical Missile Wing on 19 August 1986
Activated on 12 December 1986
Inactivated on 31 January 1989
Consolidated with the 303d Reconnaissance Systems Wing as the 303d Reconnaissance Systems Wing on 23 June 2006

303d Aeronautical Systems Wing

- Established as the Reconnaissance Systems Wing on 23 November 2004

Activated on 18 January 2005
Consolidated with the 303d Tactical Missile Wing on 23 June 2006
Redesignated 303d Aeronautical Systems Wing on 14 July 2006
Inactivated on 1 July 2010

=== Assignments ===
- 36th Air Division, 4 September 1951 (attached to 5th Air Division, 5 October–6 November 1952, 7th Air Division, 4 March–5 June 1954, 3rd Air Division, 4 July–4 October 1956 and 5 April–4 July 1958
- 12th Air Division (later 12 Strategic Aerospace Division), 15 March 1960 – 15 June 1964
- Third Air Force, 12 December 1986 – 31 January 1989
- Aeronautical Systems Center, 18 January 2005 – 1 July 2010

=== Components ===
Group

- 303d Bombardment Group: 4 September 1951 – 16 Jun 1952 (not operational)
- 645th Aeronautical Systems Group

Squadrons

- 9th Air Refueling Squadron: attached 15 Jan-5 Oct 1952 and 15 Nov 1952 – 25 Apr 1953
- 43rd Air Refueling Squadron: 15 Mar-15 Nov 1960
- 303d Air Refueling Squadron: attached 4 Sep 1951 – 8 Apr 1952 (not operational); assigned 18 Feb 1953 – 1 Feb 1956 (detached 19 Apr-2 Jun 1955)
- 358th Bombardment Squadron: attached 4 Sep 1951 – 15 Jun 1952, assigned 16 Jun 1952 – 15 Jun 1964
- 359th Bombardment Squadron: attached 4 Sep 1951 – 15 Jun 1952, assigned 16 Jun 1952 – 15 Jun 1964
- 360th Bombardment Squadron: attached 4 Sep 1951 – 15 Jun 1952, assigned 16 Jun 1952 – 15 Jun 1964
- 427th Bombardment Squadron: 1 Dec 1958 – 1 Jan 1962 (not operational, 1 Sep 1961 – 1 Jan 1962)
- 87th Tactical Missile Squadron: 12 December 1986 to 31 January 1989
- 303d Tactical Missile Maintenance Squadron: 12 December 1986 to 31 January 1989

Detachments: Detachment, 96th Air Refueling Squadron: attached c. 4 July–c. 4 October 1956

=== Stations ===
- Davis-Monthan Air Force Base, Arizona, 4 September 1951 – 15 June 1964
- RAF Molesworth, England, 12 December 1986 – 31 January 1989

BGM-109G Missile site located at: 52°22′55″N 000°25′41″W

- Wright-Patterson Air Force Base, Ohio, 18 January 2005 – 1 July 2010

=== Aircraft and missiles ===
- Boeing B-29 Superfortress, 1951–1953
- Boeing KB-29 Superfortress, 1952, 1952–1953
- Boeing B-47 Stratojet, 1953–1964
- Boeing KC-97 Stratofreighter, 1953–1956, 1956, 1960
- BGM-109G Ground Launched Cruise Missile, 1987–1988

== See also ==
- List of B-29 units of the United States Air Force
- List of B-47 units of the United States Air Force
- List of BGM-109G GLCM Units
- List of United States Air Force missile squadrons
