= Lee Embree =

Lee Embree (July 9, 1915 – January 24, 2008) was an American Army staff sergeant and photographer who took the first American air-to-air photographs of the Japanese attack on Pearl Harbor in 1941. Embree took the pictures of the attack from on board an Army Air Corps B-17 which he happened to be flying on from California to Hawaii on December 7, 1941, as the Japanese attacked the Pacific Fleet stationed at Pearl Harbor.

== Personal life ==
Lee Embree was born and raised in Iowa. He married his first wife, Elizabeth Gene "Betty" Lain on February 22, 1941. Betty died in 1998, and he married his second wife, Violet "Vi" Timm McRoberts, in 2001.

== Pearl Harbor photographs ==
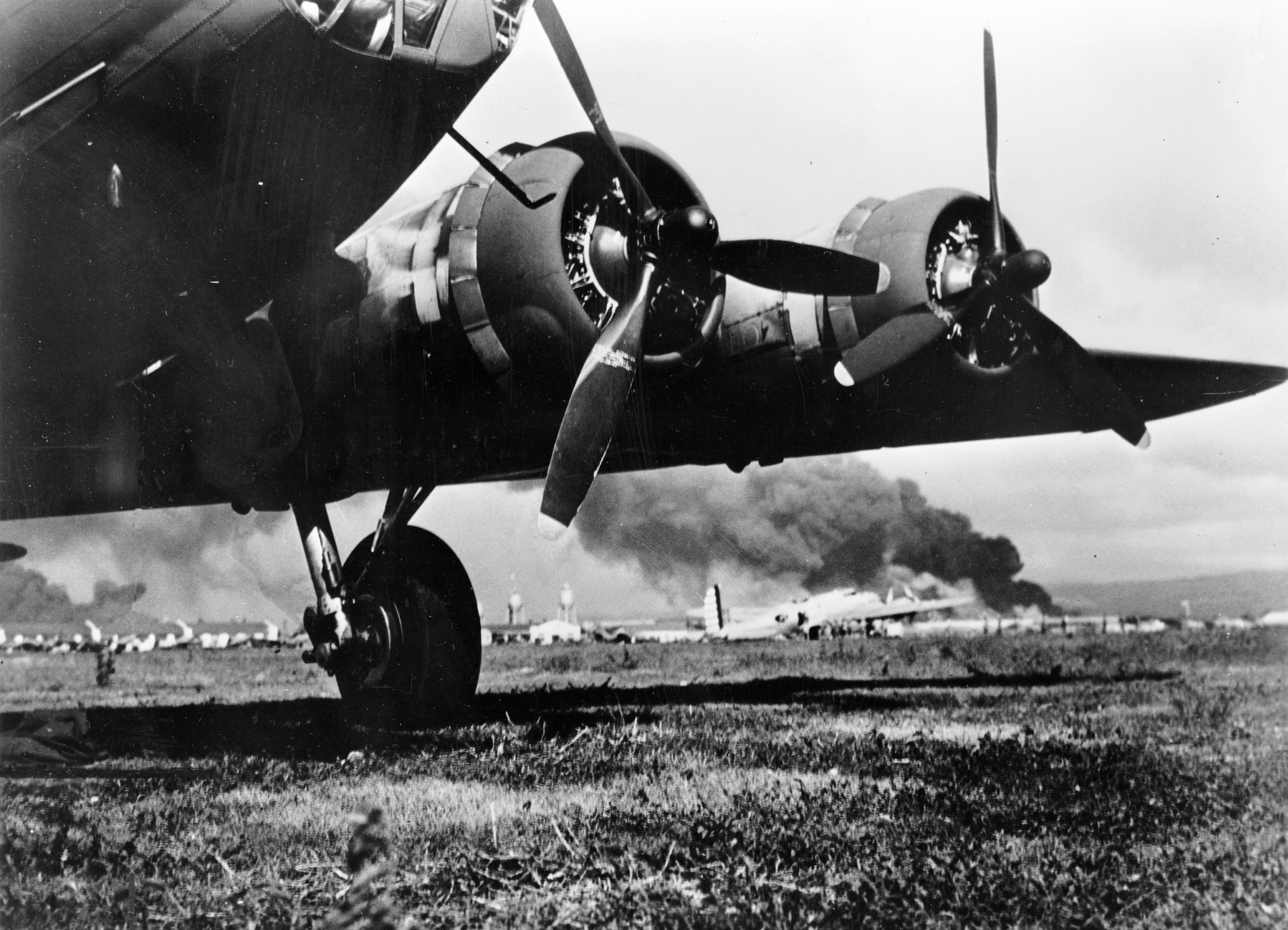
Ground photo by Lee Embree showing damage to Hickam Field. A plane from Embree's B-17 squadron, which was forced to land at Hickham, is shown in the foreground.

Embree first enlisted in the Army Air Corps in 1936. By 1941, the year of the Attack on Pearl Harbor, Embree had become a staff sergeant.

Embree snapped a number of pictures of the attack, but eventually stopped. In a 2001 interview, he explained "Many people have asked me why I didn't take more photos from the air... I can only answer that I was so flabbergasted at what I saw that I forgot about the camera that was in my hand."

== Later life ==
Embree enlisted in the Air Force Reserve in 1945. He officially retired as a major from the military in 1957. He and his family lived and worked in Southern California for many years. Embree moved to Port Angeles, Washington, in 1988.

Embree was interviewed in 2003 by a production crew for the Discovery Channel for a documentary on the Pearl Harbor attacks. He also appeared in the KCTS series Stories of the Northwest in 2007. The locally produced series, which focused on the lives of World War II veterans in the Pacific Northwest, was aired as a complement to PBS' The War.

Embree's photographs, as well as his Speed Graphic camera, goggles and dog tags, were placed on display at the Museum of Flight at Boeing Field in Seattle, Washington, in 2007.

== Death ==
Lee Embree died at his home in Port Angeles on January 24, 2008, of a kidney infection at the age of 92. He was buried at Mount Angeles Memorial Park. He was survived by his second wife, and by two children, three grandchildren, three stepchildren and five step-grandchildren.
