= Casablanca–Anfa Airport =

Former airport of Casablanca, Morocco

- IATA: ~~CAS~~; ICAO: ~~GMMC~~

Summary
- Airport type: Defunct
- Serves: ~~Casablanca, Morocco~~
- Elevation AMSL: 203 ft (62 m)
- Coordinates: 33°33′25″N 007°39′38″W

Map
- Location of airport in Morocco

Runways
| Direction | Length | | Surface |
| Direction | m | ft | Surface |
|---|---|---|---|
| ~~08/26~~ | ~~2,104~~ | ~~6,903~~ | ~~Asphalt~~ |

Casablanca–Anfa Airport (French: Aéroport de Casablanca–Anfa, Arabic: مطار الدار البيضاء أنفا) was an airport in Morocco ~~(IATA: CAS, ICAO: GMMC)~~, located about 6 kilometres (4 mi) southwest of Casablanca. Anfa Airport was one of three airports serving the Casablanca area, the others being the newer and larger Mohammed V International Airport and the Casablanca Tit Mellil Airport.

Anfa Airport is now closed, and its buildings and runways have been demolished.

As of 2025 Royal Air Maroc still indicates that its registered office is on the airport property.

== History ==
Built in the 1920s by the French colonial government, Anfa Airport was the primary airport for Casablanca until the United States Air Force closed its base at Nouasseur in 1959. The Nouasseur Air Base has been expanded over the years to handle large jet aircraft and has become Casablanca's primary airport, Mohammed V International Airport.

During World War II, Anfa Airport was taken over by the Vichy French government and used as an airport as well as an air base for the Vichy French Air Force (French: Armée de l'Air de Vichy) with its limited aircraft allowed by the armistice with Nazi Germany. It was also used by Deutsche Luft Hansa and German military transports and was depicted in the fictional 1942 film Casablanca.

Anfa Airport was one of the primary Allied objectives during Operation Torch, the invasion of North Africa, and was seized in the initial landings in the Casablanca area. After its capture by Allied forces, it functioned as an Allied military airfield throughout the remainder of the war, supporting the United States Army during the North African Campaign, and also as an Air Transport Command cargo hub on the North African Route. It served as a transit point for United States Army Air Forces aircraft heading to England to equip the Eighth Air Force, as well as for the Twelfth and Fifteenth Air Forces in the Mediterranean Theater, as part of the southern air transport route from the United States via Brazil and Dakar in Senegal. It was returned to civilian control late in 1945. The airport is now closed and is undergoing a major urbanization project.

Anfa Airport was replaced as a commercial airport by Mohammed V International Airport; however, it continued to serve as a pilot training airfield until it ceased all operations in 2007.

== Other facilities ==
Royal Air Maroc has/had its head office on the airport property. As of 2019 the airline still states that Anfa is the location of its head office.

By 2008 Royal Air Maroc (RAM) Academy, the training arm of the country's national airline, had moved its activity to Benslimane and Nouaceur.
