= RAF Croughton =

Royal Air Force station near Croughton, Northamptonshire, United Kingdom

RAF Croughton
- Near Croughton, Northamptonshire in England
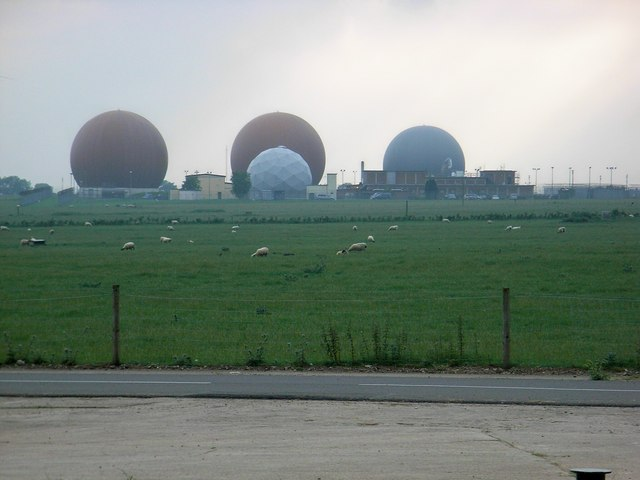
- Satellite communications antennas at RAF Croughton

Site information
- Type: RAF station (US Visiting Forces)
- Owner: Ministry of Defence
- Operator: United States Air Force
- Controlled by: US Air Forces in Europe – Air Forces Africa
- Condition: Operational

Location
- Shown within Northamptonshire
- Coordinates: 51°59′15″N 001°11′10″W
- Area: 278 hectares (690 acres)

Site history
- Built: 1938
- In use: 1939 – 1947 (Royal Air Force); 1950 – present (US Air Force)

Garrison information
- Garrison: 501st Combat Support Wing
- Occupants: 422nd Air Base Group

Airfield information
- Elevation: 137 metres (449 ft) AMSL

Royal Air Force Croughton or more simply RAF Croughton is a Royal Air Force station in Northamptonshire, England, located southeast of the village of Croughton. It is currently a United States Air Force communications station, home to the 422nd Air Base Group and operates one of Europe's largest military switchboards, processing approximately a third of all U.S. military communications in Europe.

== History ==
=== Early years ===
RAF Croughton was built in 1938, and was originally known as Brackley Landing Ground until 1940 when it became RAF Brackley. In July 1941 the name changed again and the station became RAF Croughton.

It consisted of 694 acres (281 hectares) consolidated from three farms. Three grass runways with concrete taxiways dominated the high ground with the tower and other infrastructure buildings along the north side of the station and the slope leading up to the runways. In June 1940 the station became a satellite for RAF Upper Heyford for No. 16 Operational Training Unit (No. 16 OTU) to provide the unit with extra airfield space for night-flying training.

Much of this training was for Commonwealth pilots (Canadians, South Africans, Australians, and New Zealanders) on Handley Page Hampdens, Bristol Blenheims, and Vickers Wellington bombers. The unit fell under the operational control of the newly formed No. 7 Group RAF of RAF Bomber Command.

=== Second World War ===
In September 1940 the Air Ministry decided that certain stations would be designated as emergency airfields. These stations would give assistance to any operational aircraft returning damaged or with engine problems. The Station Commander at RAF Upper Heyford received one of these orders. RAF Brackley (Croughton) would remain open with its flare paths illuminated irrespective of enemy activity in the area. This meant that RAF Brackley along with other emergency airfields attracted additional enemy night attacks. Added to this accepted high risk was the fact that RAF Brackley was a training airfield. During the war both sides considered it worthwhile to attack and disrupt training programmes. Because training fields and aircraft were lightly defended, they made for easier targets. For these reasons, it was not uncommon for the station or training crews conducting night training to receive the attention of the Luftwaffe.

While the station remained a satellite for RAF Upper Heyford and No. 16 OTU until July 1942 and even partially re-equipped with Wellington bombers, its future had already changed. No. 23 Squadron of RAF Flying Training Command (FTC) was desperately seeking a suitable airfield to re-house its No. 1 Glider Training School (No. 1 GTS).

Its then home was a small airfield at RAF Thame in Buckinghamshire and FTC felt it inadequate for glider training. Several airfields in the near vicinity made the short list, but RAF Croughton became the new home for the gliders. On 19 July 1942, No. 1 GTS began to move in and by 1 August 1942 they were settled into their new home. During this training Hawker Hectors, North American Harvards, and Miles Masters pulled General Aircraft Hotspur gliders, while Douglas Dakotas pulled the larger Airspeed Horsa gliders.

With this new mission came a far stricter training regime and standards than that usually found at an RAF training station. The reason for this was the dual roles required of the glider pilots. They would receive twelve weeks of basic flying training, before moving to one of the GTS. Training at the GTS took another twelve weeks. From there they would move onto their operational units. In addition to flying the gliders, pilots had to be as highly trained and disciplined as infantry troops. This way they could make a positive contribution to the battle after landing in the assault areas. However, they would only remain in the assault area until their recovery. By the end of 1942 the RAF thought it had enough trained glider pilots, at least for foreseeable operational need. There was now a large number of trained glider pilots and this led to its own problems and another change in the station's mission.

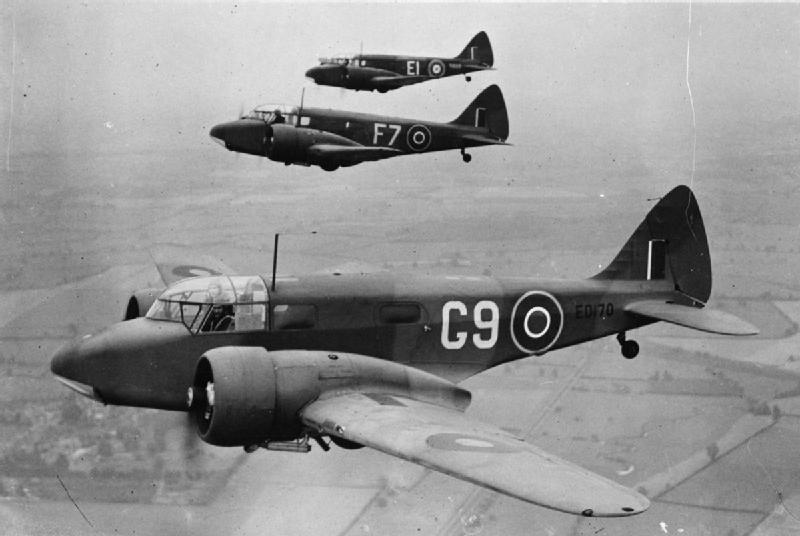
Airspeed Oxford

As the last class passed out of RAF Croughton on 24 March 1943, the glider school closed down. It continued to be a training base, but now it was a satellite for Kidlington in Oxfordshire where the No. 20 (Pilots) Advanced Flying Unit RAF (AFU) gave refresher or advanced training to pilots. Established in 1942, the AFUs provided refresher courses to pilots trained overseas under the British Commonwealth Air Training Plan. It also gave newly qualified pilots experience with flying in British weather and handling heavier aircraft. With the No. 20 AFU, this meant the Airspeed Oxford. Pilots training with these aircraft knew they were destined for either Bomber or Coastal Command.

On 15 April 1943 No. 1538 (Beam Approach Training) Flight RAF (No.15 BATF) formed at RAF Croughton and added to the station's training mission. Before this many of the pilots training with No. 20 AFU received their Beam Approach Training at RAF Feltwell. Both No. 1538 BATF and No. 20 AFU remained at RAF Croughton until 18 October 1944 when the airfield returned to Flying Training Command. On this date No. 1538 BATF disbanded and No. 20 AFU retired to Kidlington.

RAF Flying Training Command needed the station to reform No. 1 Glider Training School. The decision to reopen glider training came about when the army finally agreed that the glider pilots should be RAF. From the beginning both the RAF and Army had differing opinions as to who should pilot the gliders. The Army felt the Glider Pilot Regiment was an elite force and that the pilots should be from the Army or at the very least trained to the same standard. The Army even rejected a proposal from the RAF to have a RAF pilot sit in the second pilot or co-pilot seat. This changed after Operation Market Garden.

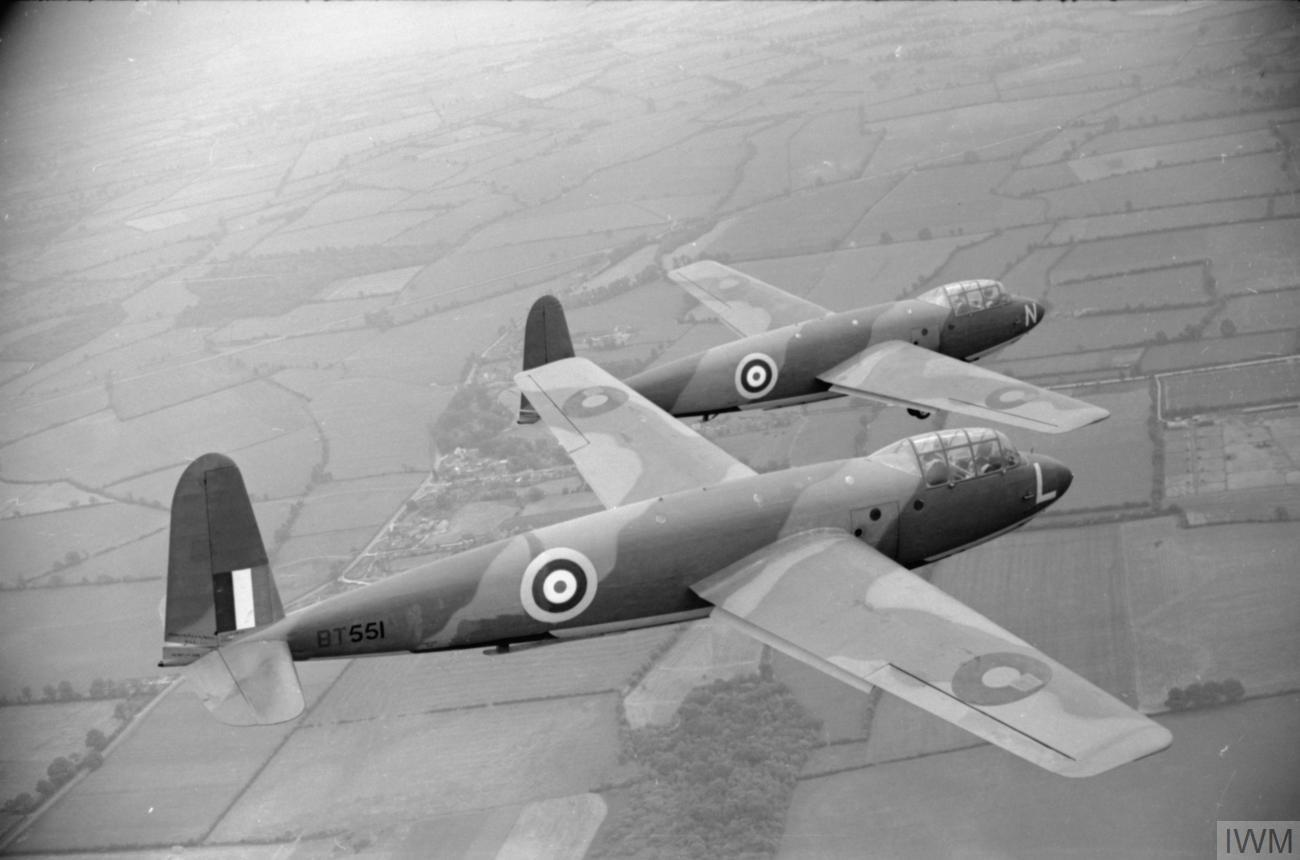
Hotspur Glider

During the Arnhem portion of that operation 460 glider pilots were either killed or captured, with another 150 wounded. The Army agreed to let the RAF help fill the vacancies in the Glider Pilot Regiment. Of the planned 1,000 trained glider pilot target figure, to be reached by April 1945, the RAF proposed to fill 500. No. 1 GTS arrived at RAF Croughton on 1 November 1944. Training continued until after the war and even included the addition of a Glider Instructor Flight.

During August 1945 No. 1 GTS came under the command of No. 21 Heavy Glider Conversion Unit RAF at RAF Brize Norton. Flying and training ceased on 25 May 1946. With No. 1 GTS leaving RAF Croughton, its remaining aircraft, Hotspurs and Masters worth preserving, moved to No. 3 GTS at RAF Wellesbourne Mountford.

=== Postwar – United States Air Force use ===
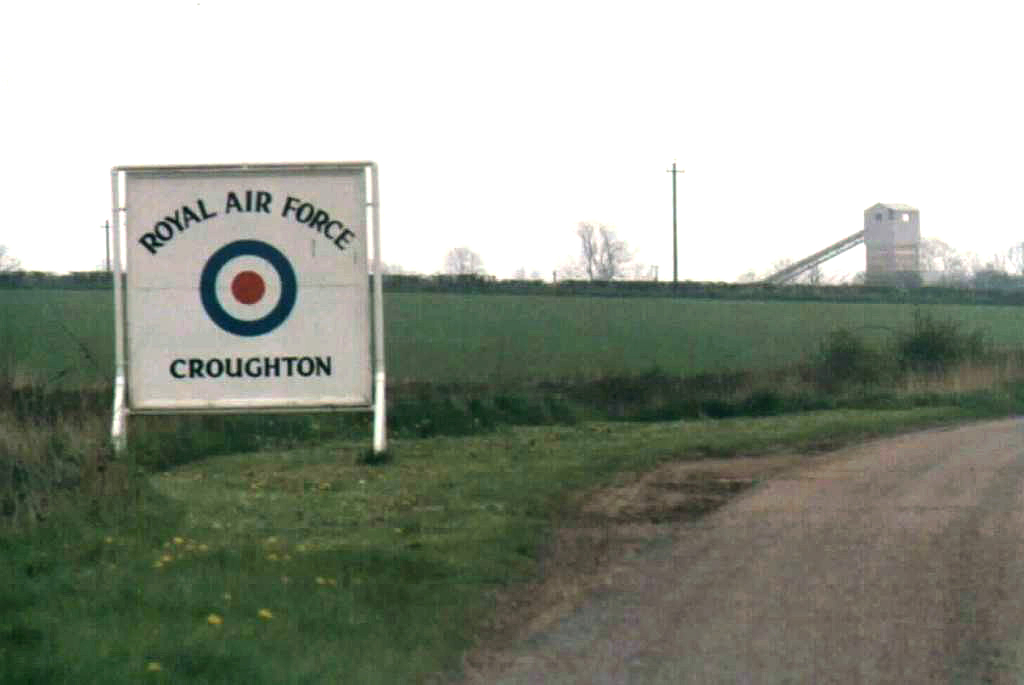
RAF Croughton Front Gate Sign, 1977.

From 1947 to 1950 the Station remained fairly quiet and forgotten except for its occasional use as an ammunitions store. That all changed towards the end of 1950 when the USAF took over the station when the 1969th Communications Squadron at RAF South Ruislip formed a detachment at RAF Croughton. This began RAF Croughton's new communications mission. Over the next several decades the units stationed at RAF Croughton changed many times, but the mission remained communications.

In 1955 this detachment became the 1230th Airways and Air Communications Service Squadron (AACS). As part of the establishment of the Air Force Communication Service as a separate major command, Air Force Communications Command, in 1961, the 1230 AACS redesignated to become the 2130th Communications Squadron (CS). In just over ten years the mission and unit grew to the point that it needed to redesignate to the 2130th Communications Group (CG). By 1977, the 2130 CG controlled USAF communication resources from as far south as Cornwall, England and as far north as Keflavík, Iceland.

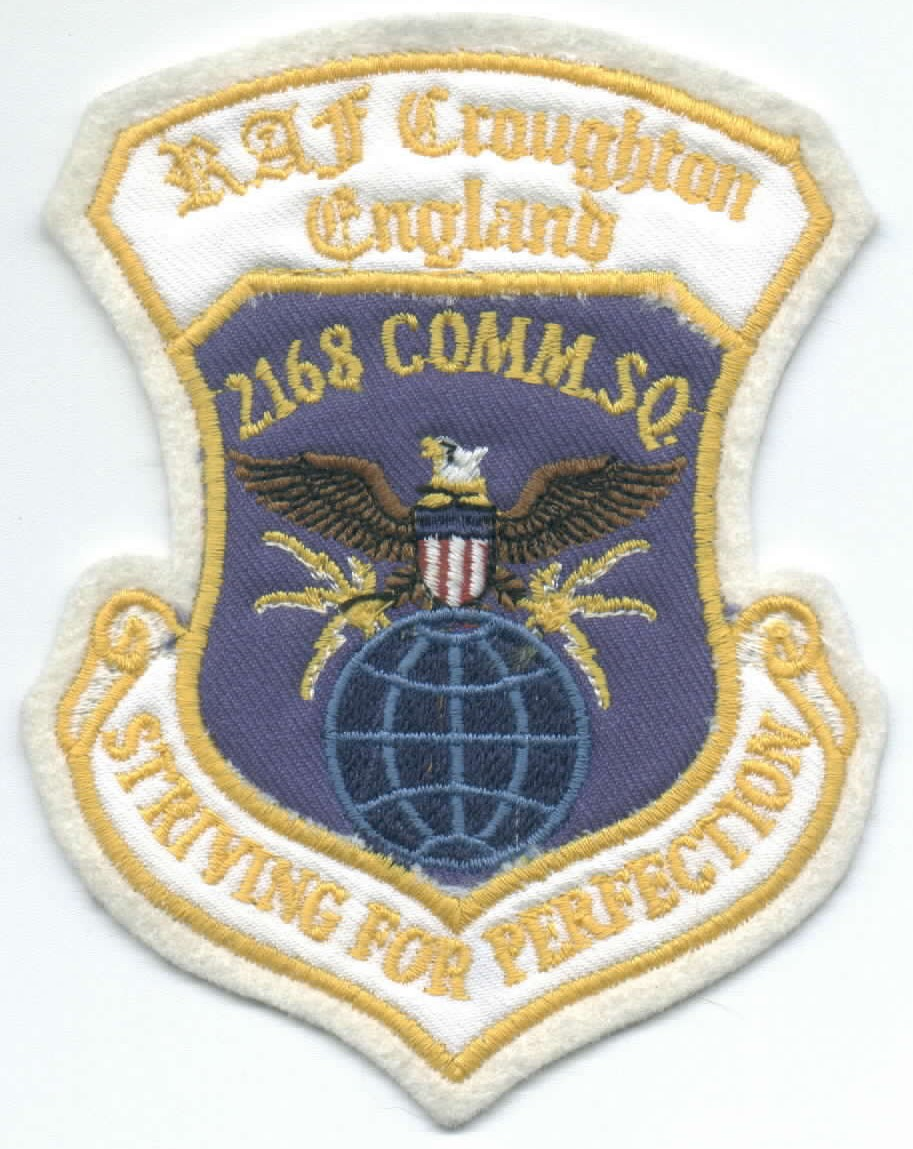
2168 Communications Squadron Patch.

With the formation of the 2147th Communications Group at RAF Mildenhall and the realignment of many squadrons, detachments, and Operating Locations in 1980, the 2130 CG inactivated. Several communications missions at RAF Croughton, like the Defense Communications System, and Global Command and Control Radio System, combined with the responsibility for their maintenance falling on the 2168th Communications Squadron at RAF Upper Heyford. This changed again with the reactivation of the 2130th Communications Squadron on 1 July 1983 to manage the communications missions at RAF Croughton. The mission increased in December 1985 when the Giant Talk station at RAF Croughton began operations. In 1988 the 2130 CS again redesignated to become the 2130th Communications Group.

The beginning of 1993 saw several big changes for RAF Croughton. Most of these had to do with mission support. With the projected inactivation of the 20th Fighter Wing at RAF Upper Heyford and closure of that station the 2130 CG redesignated to the 630th Communications Squadron. This new squadron functionally aligned under the 100th Communications Group (CG) at RAF Mildenhall. However, this was no ordinary communications squadron. Before the closure of RAF Upper Heyford, RAF Croughton had relied on the larger base for administrative support to one degree or another. The closure of RAF Upper Heyford forced the squadron to look for ways to be as self-sufficient as possible. To handle most day-to-day support functions, the squadron had its own finance, personnel, supply, and other support elements. It became a mini-station.

During this time RAF Croughton received most of its mission support from the 100 CG as well as some from the 100th Regional Support Group (RSG). Both of these units resided at RAF Mildenhall under the 100th Air Refueling Wing (ARW). This changed on 1 July 1994 when United States Air Forces in Europe (USAFE) conducted another command-wide reorganization. One result of this reorganization was the inactivation of the 100 RSG, its subordinate squadrons and the 100 CG. In their place, USAFE activated the 603rd Regional Support Group as an independent group directly under Third Air Force. This in turn forced the redesignation of the 630 CS to the 603rd Communications Squadron.

The end of 1995 saw USAFE clarifying the roles and missions of the numbered air forces. This resulted in a change that led to the alignment of three UK and one Norway Geographically Separate Units (GSUs) under the 100 ARW. Third Air Force issued an order, effective 24 May 1996, assigning all personnel formally attached to the 603 RSG and its subordinates to the 100 ARW for administrative control. For RAF Croughton this led to the inactivation of the 603 CS and the activation of the 422nd Air Base Squadron (422 ABS) on 1 August 1996.

=== 21st century ===
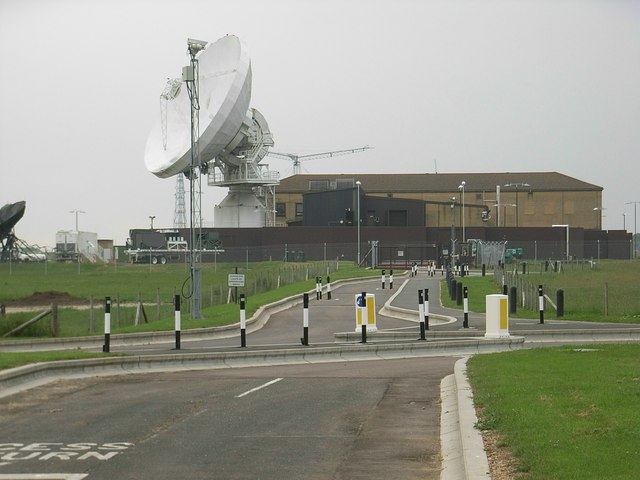
The RAF Croughton dish in 2007

On 12 May 2005, the 422 ABG became a unit of the 501st Combat Support Wing (501 CSW) as part of an alignment of all major Geographically Separate Units (GSUs) in England.

In 2012 a 2.5 gigabits per second data circuit was established to Camp Lemonnier in Djibouti, U.S. Africa Command's (AFRICOM) only permanent military base in Africa.

In November 2013 Tom Watson MP, was reported as saying that there was: "an urgent need for "public scrutiny" of the activities at RAF Croughton. The US Air Force station is a major hub for American military and clandestine communications". It is reported to have been central to the monitoring of the mobile phone of the German Chancellor Angela Merkel.

In December 2013 The Independent reported that the base was used to relay U.S. Central Intelligence Agency and National Security Agency communications, and it was a key intelligence facility in the UK. In 2014 byelaws were enacted by statutory instrument prohibiting various activities in and around the base.

National Review (an American publication) refers in a July 2015 story to: 'the Joint Intelligence Analysis Center (JIAC), an "intelligence fusion center" that Congress approved for construction at UK airfield RAF Croughton. The facility would bring together intelligence analysts from U.S. European Command (EUCOM), AFRICOM, and NATO under one roof, fostering a level of collaboration military commanders say is crucial to confronting Russian aggression and Islamic fundamentalism in Africa'.

In 2016 the United States Department of Defense announced that a £200 million Joint Intelligence Analysis Centre would be built at the base, to house up to 1,250 staff analysing intelligence from Europe and Africa, some transferred from the Joint Analysis Center at RAF Molesworth. However an Office of the Inspector General investigation found that financial analysis leading to this decision was inaccurate.

The 2017 Office of the Inspector General report recorded that the base provided command, control, communications, and computer support to Department of Defense and civilian agencies across Europe, and was staffed by about 265 U.S. military personnel, 140 Department of Defense civilians, and 200 UK Ministry of Defence employees. It provided about 25% of all European to United States military communications.

In August 2019 Harry Dunn, a local teenager, was killed in a collision with a vehicle driven on the wrong side of the road by Anne Sacoolas, the wife of a US government employee working on the Royal Air Force station used by the United States Air Force. Friends of the victim gathered to demonstrate outside the base.

On 9 July 2020 an adjournment debate on RAF Croughton, in the House of Commons, was led by local Member of Parliament Andrea Leadsom, who called for the expansion of the airfield to be stopped and for the base entrance to be moved to the A43 main road.

On 22 March 2021 the 501 CSW announced that the United States Department of the Air Force had completed its business case analysis and determined it was not cost effective to consolidate support facilitates at RAF Molesworth. Subsequently the U.S. Department of Defense submitted, and UK Ministry of Defence approved, a request to allow RAF Alconbury to remain open and to continue as the primary location for Joint Intelligence Analysis Center support.

== Role and operations ==
RAF Croughton houses the 422nd Air Base Group whose function is to provide installation support, services, force protection, and worldwide communications across the entire spectrum of operations. The group is located in the UK and supports NATO, US European Command, US Central Command, Air Force Special Operations Command, US Department of State operations and Ministry of Defence operations. The group sustains more than 410 C2 circuits and supports 25 percent of all European Theater to continental United States (CONUS) communications.

== Based units ==
Notable units based at RAF Croughton.

=== United States Air Force ===
United States Air Forces in Europe - Air Forces Africa (USAFE-AFAFRICA)

501st Combat Support Wing

- 422nd Air Base Group
  - 422nd Air Base Squadron
  - 422nd Civil Engineer Squadron
  - 422nd Communications Squadron
  - 422nd Medical Squadron
  - 422nd Security Forces Squadron

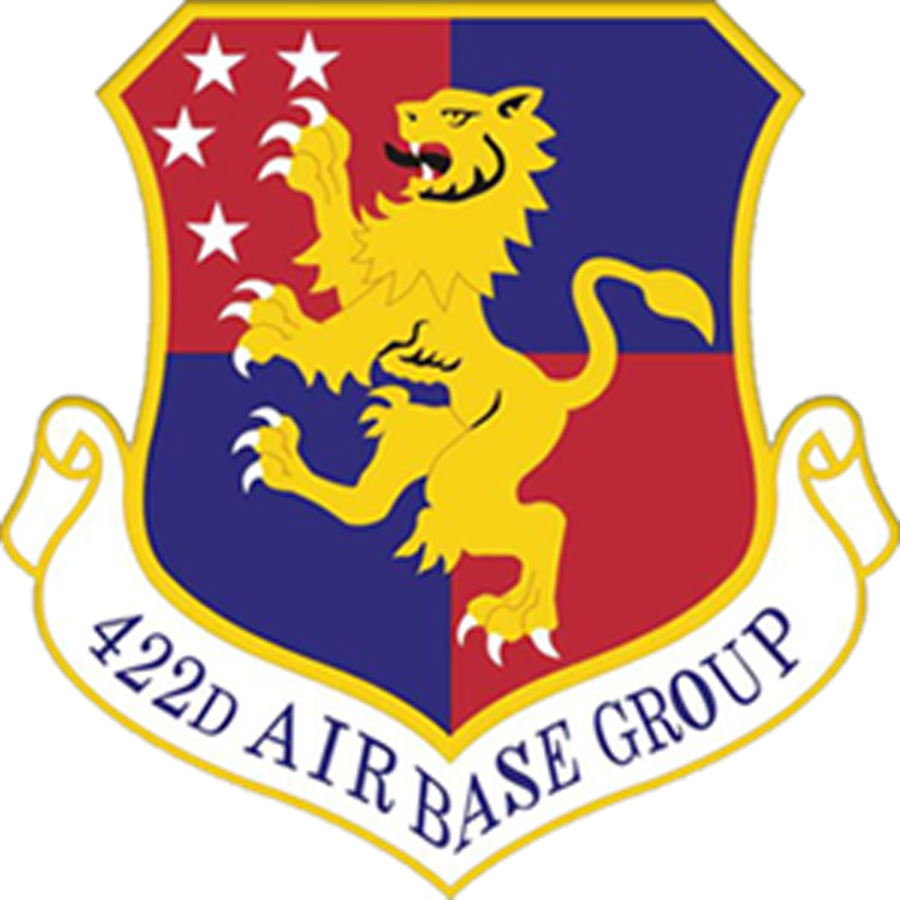
422nd Air Base Group Patch

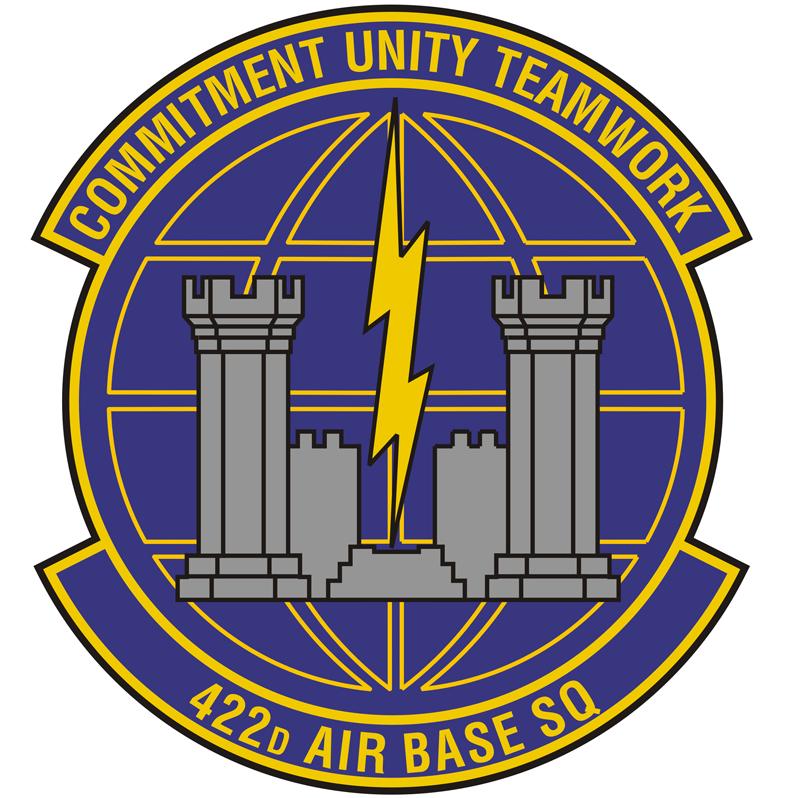
422nd Air Base Squadron Patch

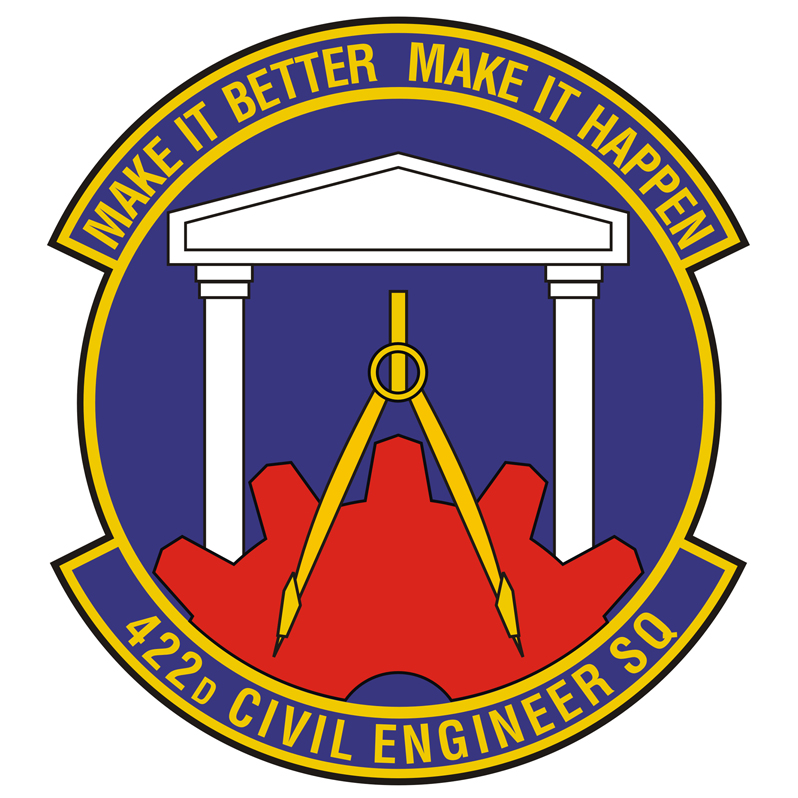
422nd Civil Engineer Squadron Patch

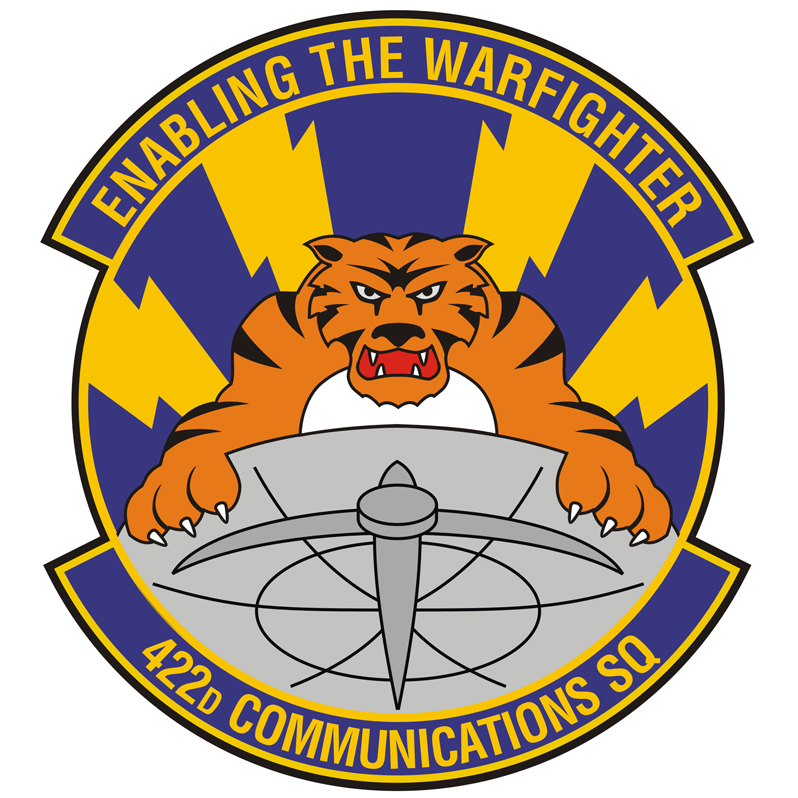
422nd Communications Squadron Patch

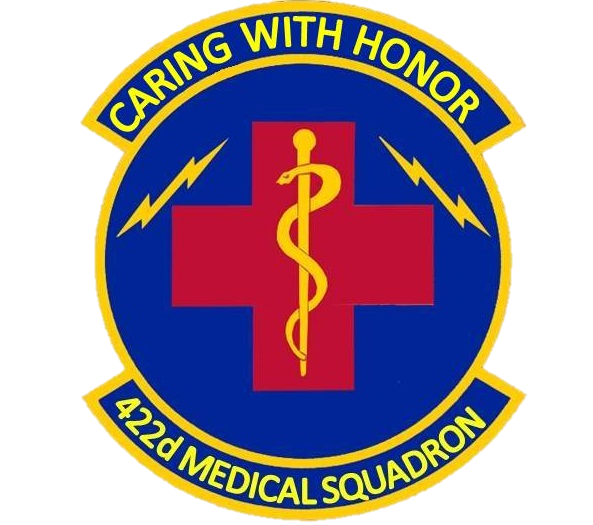
422nd Medical Squadron Patch

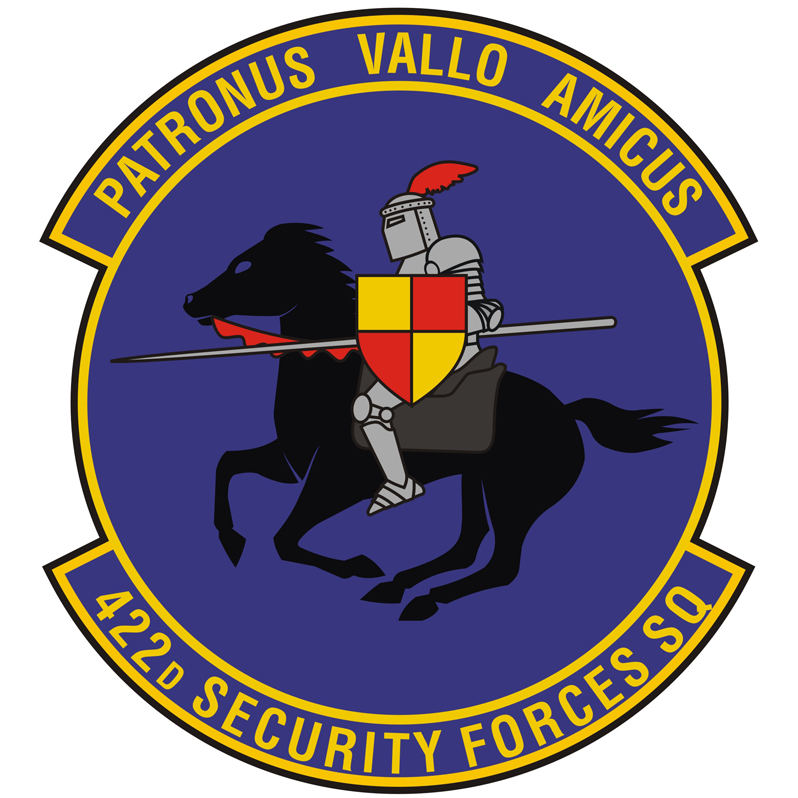
422nd Security Forces Squadron Patch

== See also ==
- List of Royal Air Force stations
