= NIFC =

NIFC may refer to:

- NATO Intelligence Fusion Centre
- National Interagency Fire Center
- National Irish Freedom Committee
- North of Ireland FC
- Narodowy Instytut Fryderyka Chopina (English: Fryderyk Chopin Institute)
- Not Issued For Circulation (numismatics: e.g. proof coinage)
