= 423rd Air Base Group =

United States Air Force unit

423rd Air Base Group

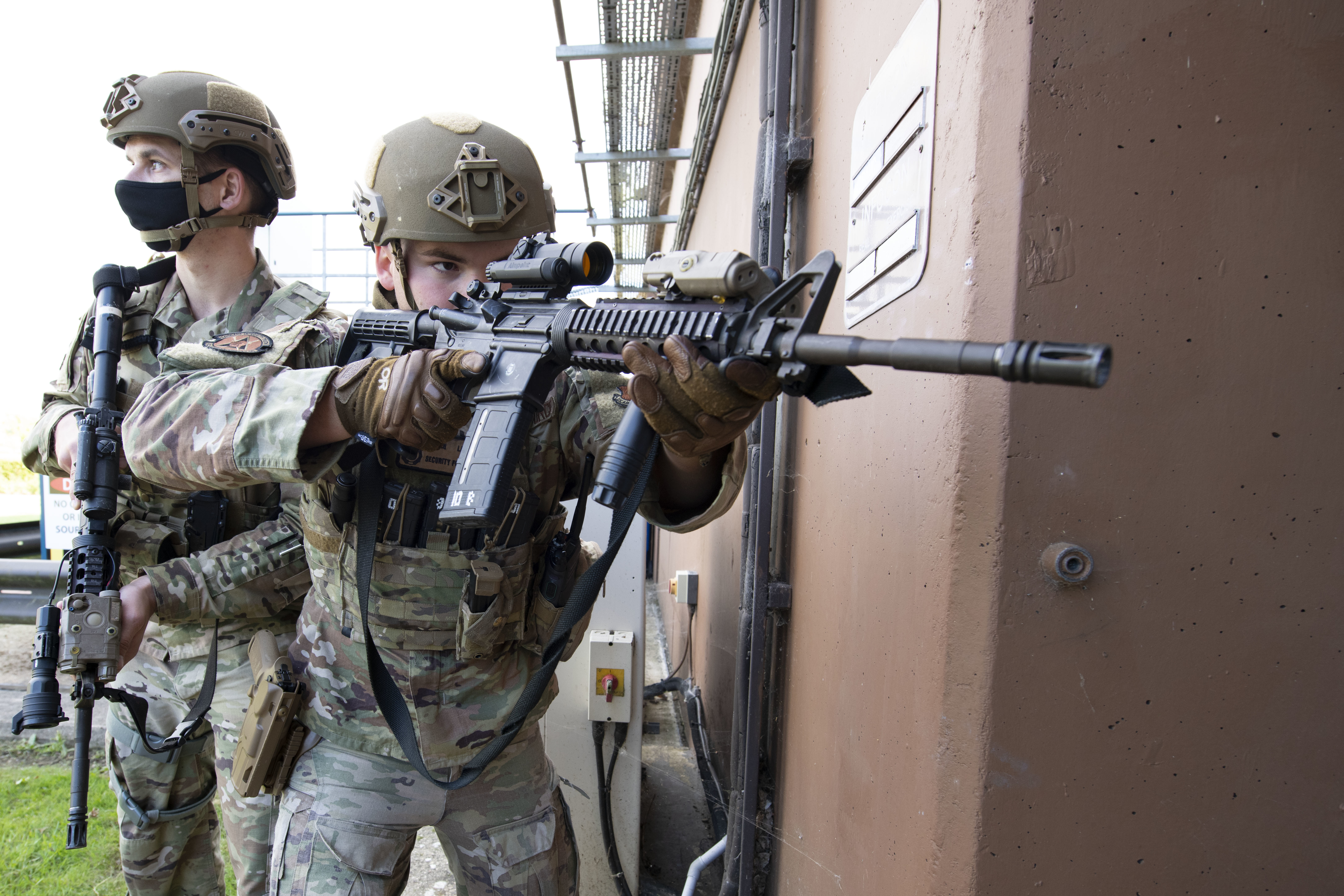
- Airmen with the group's 423rd Security Forces Squadron prepare to clear a building during an exercise at RAF Molesworth in 2020
- Active: 1942–1947; 1951–1953; 1995–present
- Country: United States
- Branch: United States Air Force
- Role: Administrative support for Air Force units
- Part of: United States Air Forces in Europe – Air Forces Africa: Third Air Force; 501st Combat Support Wing
- Garrison/HQ: RAF Alconbury, United Kingdom

Insignia
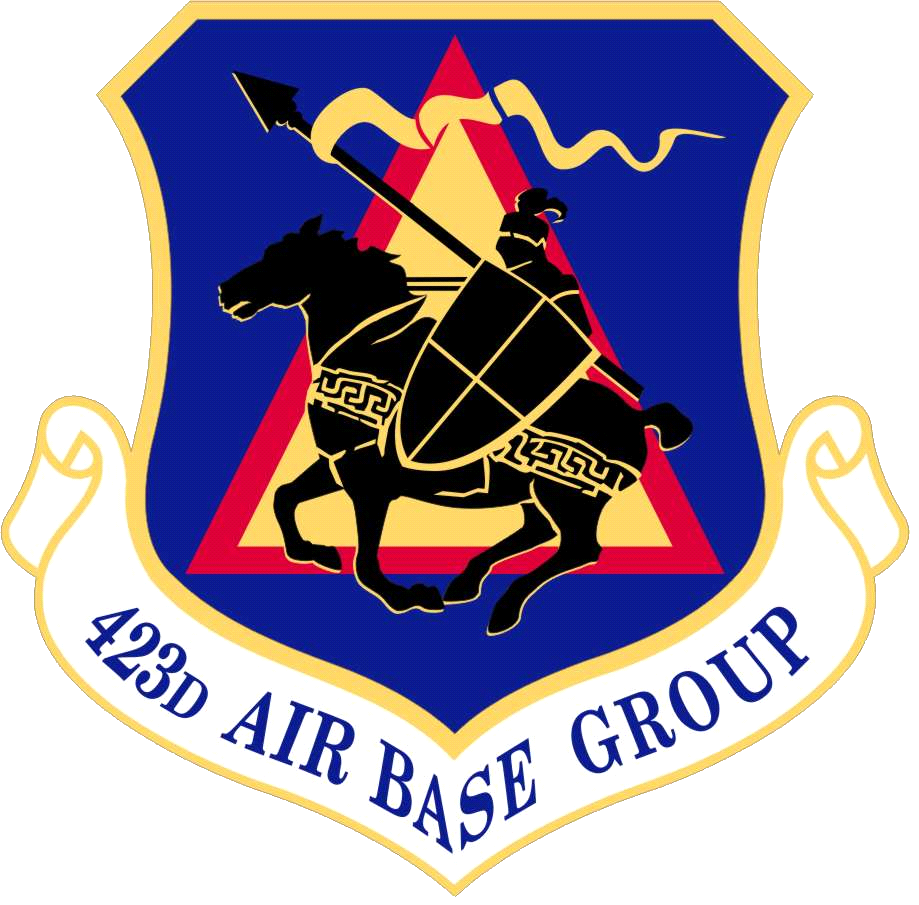
- 423rd Air Base Group emblem

The 423rd Air Base Group is a United States Air Force unit located at RAF Alconbury near the town of Huntingdon in the United Kingdom. Its mission is to support operations at RAF Alconbury and the nearby base of RAF Molesworth. Its primary customer is the Joint Analysis Center located at RAF Molesworth.

== Units ==
As of July 2022 the 423rd Air Base Group is made up of the following units:

- 421st Air Base Squadron (421 ABS) (RAF Menwith Hill, United Kingdom)
- 423rd Civil Engineer Squadron (423 CES)
- 423rd Communications Squadron (423 CS)
- 423rd Force Support Squadron (423 FSS)
- 423rd Medical Squadron (423 MDS)
- 423rd Security Forces Squadron (423 SFS)
- 426th Air Base Squadron (426 ABS) (Sola Air Station, Norway)

== History ==
=== World War II ===
The group was first organized at Duncan Field, Texas in 1942 as the 45th Air Depot Group. After training in the United States, it moved to England, where it supported units of Ninth Air Force. Its main components were a Supply Squadron and a Repair Squadron, although it also included non-Air Corps units from ordnance, quartermaster, and chemical branches.

It moved to the continent of Europe in 1944. There, a number of mobile reclamation squadrons were assigned for brief periods. Following V-E Day, the group remained in Germany as part of the occupation forces until inactivating in 1947.

=== Depot support in France ===
The unit, redesignated the 73rd Air Depot Wing was organized at Kelly Field. Once organized, it moved to France to operate the Chateauroux Air Depot. However, it was inactivated in 1953 and replaced by the 7373rd Air Depot Wing, as the Air Force converted many support units to table of distribution units.

=== Support in England ===
The 423rd Air Base Group was activated on 12 May 2005, when it replaced the 423rd Air Base Squadron, which had been activated on 12 July 1995 at RAF Molesworth. The 423 Squadron replaced the inactivated 710th Air Base Wing, briefly active at RAF Alconbury to replace the 10th Air Base Wing, which had moved to Colorado on 1 November 1994. Exactly 10 years later, the 423rd Squadron was replaced by the 423rd Air Base Group. This was part of a larger reorganization of many geographically separated units within the United Kingdom as components of the 501st Combat Support Wing, also located at RAF Alconbury. At this time, group headquarters moved to RAF Alconbury.

In 2012, the group included around 400 personnel, including about 277 active duty military, 140 Department of Defense civilians and 170 Non-Appropriated Fund employees, as well as 255 Ministry of Defence employees.

== Organization ==
The group is organized into a group staff and six squadrons. The squadrons include the 423rd Communications Squadron, 423rd Medical Squadron (initiated 2007), 423rd Security Forces Squadron, 423rd Force Support Squadron, and 423rd Civil Engineer Squadron. The 426th Air Base Squadron is also assigned to the 423rd Air Base Group but is geographically separated and located at Stavanger Air Base, Norway.

== Lineage ==
- Constituted as the 45th Air Depot Group on 31 January 1942

Activated on 13 March 1942
Redesignated 45th Air Depot c. 1 January 1946
Inactivated c. 31 August 1947

- Redesignated 73rd Air Depot Wing

Activated on 9 January 1951
Inactivated on 15 November 1953

- Disbanded on 15 June 1983
- Reconstituted on 22 March 2005 and redesignated 423rd Air Base Group

Activated on 12 May 2005

=== Assignments ===
- Air Service Command, 13 March 1942
- Eighth Air Force, July 1943
- IX Air Force Service Command (later European Air Materiel Command), January 1944 – c. 31 August 1947
- San Antonio Air Materiel Area, 9 January 1951
- United States Air Forces in Europe, 25 July 1951 – 15 November 1953
- 501st Combat Support Wing, 12 May 2005 – present

=== Stations ===
- Duncan Field, Texas 13 March 1942
- Springfield, Illinois, 19 April 1942
- Brookley Field, Alabama, September 1942
- RAF Grove (AAF-519), England, July 1943
- Chartres (A-40), France, October 1944
- Denbury, England, January 1945
- Valenciennes, France, March 1945
- Denain/Prouvy Airfield (A-87), France April 1945
- Hanau-Langendiebach Airfield (Y-91), 1945
- Erding Air Depot (R-91), December 1945 – c. 31 August 1947
- Kelly Air Force Base, Texas, 9 January 1951
- Chateauroux Air Base, 25 July 1951 – 15 November 1953
- RAF Alconbury, 12 May 2005 – present

=== Components ===
Groups

- 73rd Air Base Group, 9 January 1951 – 15 November 1953
- 73rd Maintenance Group, 9 January 1951 – 15 November 1953
- 73rd Medical Group, 9 January 1951 – 15 November 1953
- 73rd Supply Group, 9 January 1951 – 15 November 1953
- 73rd Transportation Group, 9 January 1951 – 15 November 1953

Squadrons

- 23rd Mobile Reclamation and Repair Squadron, 1 November 1943 – c. 31 May 1945
- 25th Mobile Reclamation and Repair Squadron, 1945 – 14 June 1945
- 27th Mobile Reclamation and Repair Squadron, 1944 – c. 31 May 1945
- 33rd Mobile Reclamation and Repair Squadron, 1944
- 42nd Mobile Reclamation and Repair Squadron, c. April 1944 – c. February 1945
- 44th Air Supply Squadron, c. October 1945 – c. May 1947
- 45th Depot Repair Squadron (later 45th Air Repair Squadron), 13 March 1942 – 1945
- 45th Depot Supply Squadron (later 45th Air Supply Squadron), 13 March 1942 – 1945, 1946 – c. 31 August 1947
- 44th Mobile Reclamation and Repair Squadron, 1944 – c. April 1944
- 50th Mobile Reclamation and Repair Squadron, c. 1 December 1943 – c. February 1945
- 421st Air Base Squadron (RAF Menwith Hill, United Kingdom), 18 July 2015 – present
- 423rd Civil Engineer Squadron, 12 May 2005 – present
- 423rd Communications Squadron, 15 January 2011 – present
- 423rd Services Squadron (later 423rd Force Support Squadron), 12 May 2005 – present
- 423rd Medical Squadron, 12 May 2005 – present
- 423rd Security Forces Squadron, 12 May 2005 – present
- 426th Air Base Squadron (Sola Air Station, Norway), 11 September 2007 – present
