= Joint Analysis Center =

Intelligence center of US forces in Europe

The Joint Intelligence Operations Center Europe (JIOCEUR) Analytic Center (JAC), formerly known as the Joint Analysis Center, is a Joint Intelligence Center serving as a military intelligence analysis centre for the United States European Command located at RAF Molesworth, Cambridgeshire, United Kingdom and managed by the Defense Intelligence Agency. The area of responsibility includes over 50 countries in Europe, 33 Sub-Saharan and West African countries, and the Middle East.

The Joint Analysis Center was a conglomeration of Air Force (497th RTG / 496th RTS), Army and Navy intelligence assets from throughout the European Theatre. Personnel from the 496th RTS were key in planning and facilitating the movement of equipment and personnel into the JAC.

In January 2015, the DoD announced that Molesworth and RAF Alconbury were to close. In accordance with the European Infrastructure Consolidation announced by the Department of Defense in early 2015, "..[t]he majority of U.S. personnel, and many of the U.S.-funded host Nation positions assigned to these bases will be transferred to RAF Croughton." This was to take place 'over the next several years'. RAF Alconbury later remained as a support base for the Joint Analysis Center on the grounds of cost-effectiveness.
