= RAF Molesworth =

Royal Air Force station near Molesworth, Cambridgeshire, United Kingdom

RAF Molesworth
- Near Molesworth, Cambridgeshire in England
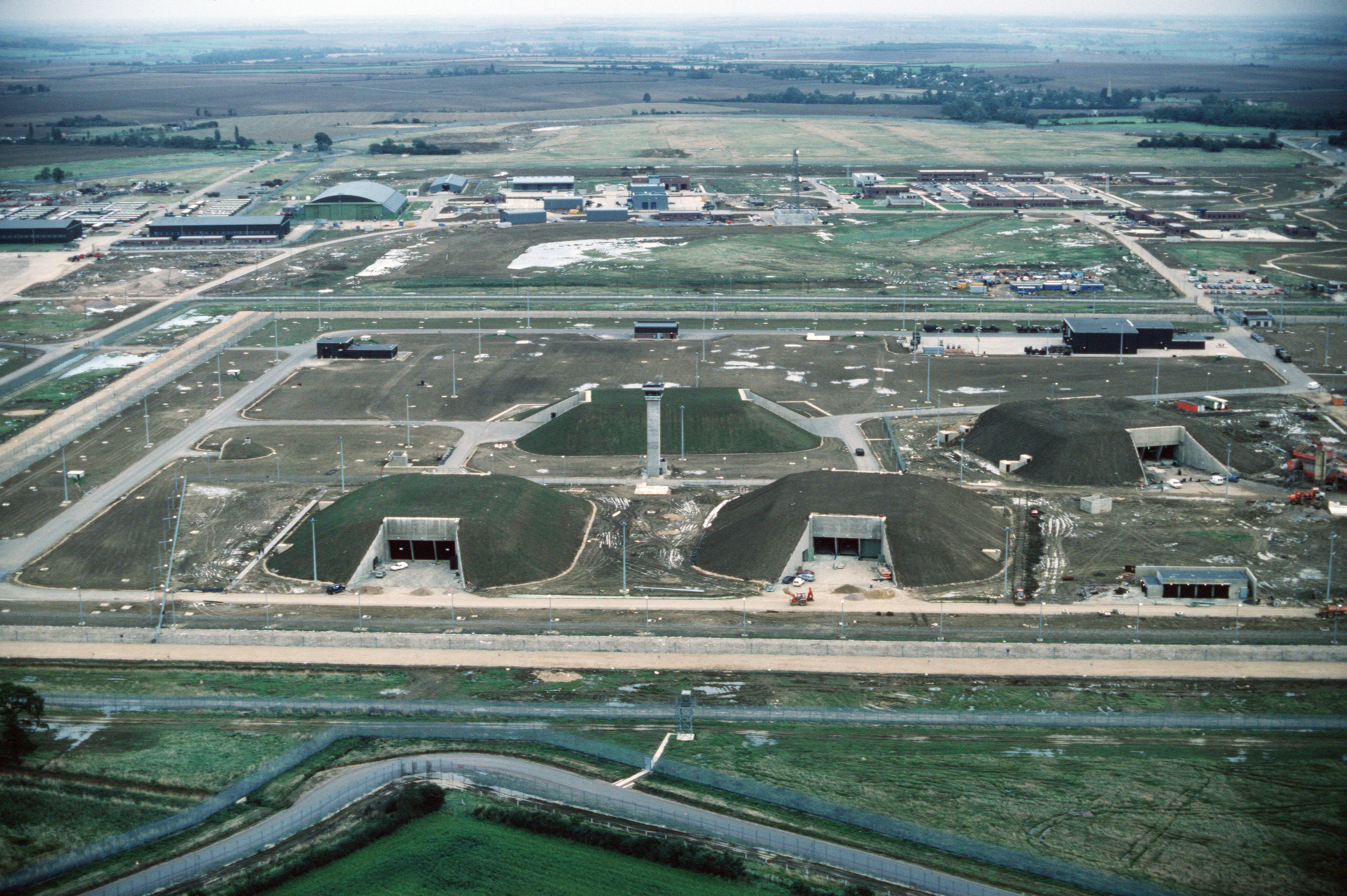
- Ground launched cruise missile shelters at RAF Molesworth during 1989

Site information
- Type: RAF station (US Visiting Forces)
- Owner: Ministry of Defence
- Operator: US Air Force
- Controlled by: US Air Forces in Europe – Air Forces Africa
- Condition: Operational

Location
- Shown within Cambridgeshire RAF Molesworth (the United Kingdom) RAF Molesworth (Europe)
- Coordinates: 52°22′46″N 000°24′18″W
- Grid reference: TL008775
- Area: 272 hectares (670 acres)

Site history
- Built: 1940
- In use: 1939–1942 (Royal Air Force); 1942–1945 (US Army Air Forces); 1945–1951 (Royal Air Force); 1951–present (US Air Force)

Garrison information
- Garrison: 423d Air Base Group

Airfield information
- Elevation: 77 metres (253 ft) AMSL

Royal Air Force Molesworth or more simply RAF Molesworth is a Royal Air Force station located near Molesworth, Cambridgeshire, England with a history dating back to 1917.

Its runway and flight line facilities were closed in 1973 and demolished. New facilities were constructed to support ground-launched cruise missile operations in the early 1980s. It was one of the two British bases to house cruise missiles and a focus for protests. It is now a non-flying facility under the control of the United States Air Force (USAF), and is one of two Royal Air Force (RAF) stations in Cambridgeshire currently used by the United States Air Forces in Europe (USAFE). Molesworth, RAF Alconbury and RAF Upwood were considered the "Tri-Base Area" due to their close geographic proximity and interdependency until RAF Upwood closed in late 2012.

RAF Alconbury and RAF Molesworth were the last Second World War era Eighth Air Force airfields in the United Kingdom that were still actively in use and controlled by the United States Air Force. It was from Molesworth on 4 July 1942 that the first USAAF Eighth Air Force mission was flown over German-occupied Europe.

Today the base is home to the Joint Intelligence Operations Center Europe Analytic Center, and a number of units from the 423rd Air Base Group.

== Overview ==
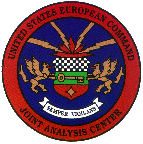

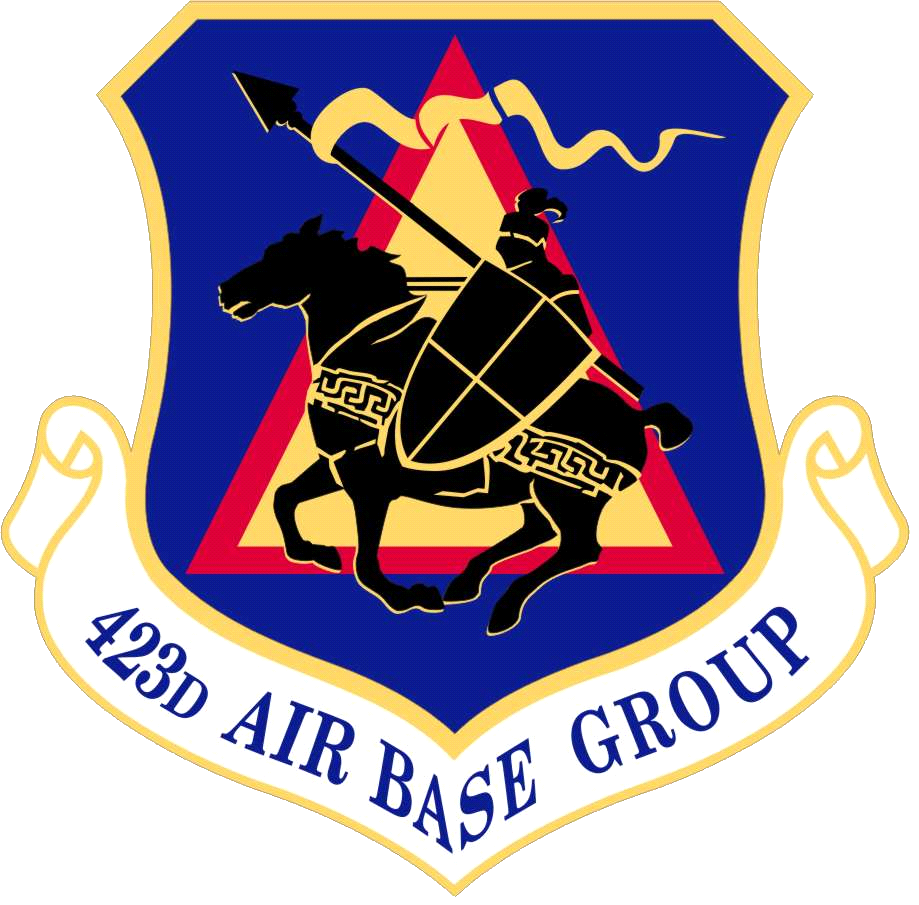

Molesworth is home to three Major Command (MAJCOM) branch sites: the United States European Command (USEUCOM) Joint Intelligence Operations Center Europe Analytic Center (JAC), United States Africa Command (USAFRICOM), Intelligence and Knowledge Directorate-Molesworth (J2-M), North Atlantic Treaty Organization (NATO) Intelligence Fusion Centre (IFC), and is garrisoned by the United States Air Force 423rd Air Base Group (423 ABG), located at RAF Alconbury.

== History ==
=== First World War ===
The Royal Flying Corps selected a site for an airfield in Huntingdonshire near the village of Old Weston during the First World War. The first flying unit to arrive at the aerodrome was 75 Squadron. No. 75 Squadron flew Royal Aircraft Factory B.E.2s, a reconnaissance and artillery spotter aircraft which saw extensive combat use over the Western Front, from Molesworth for training and pilot proficiency. The squadron remained at this airfield until September 1917.

=== Second World War ===
==== RAAF/RAF use ====
At the start of the Second World War the Air Ministry selected the area as the site for what would become RAF Molesworth. The airfield was built between 1940 and 1941. The first flying unit was Royal Australian Air Force 460 Squadron when it formed here on 15 November 1941 with Vickers Wellington IVs. No 460 Squadron departed Molesworth on 4 January 1942. RAF Bomber Command 159 squadron moved in shortly afterwards, however this unit did not remain long, moving to the Middle East on 12 January 1942.

==== USAAF use ====
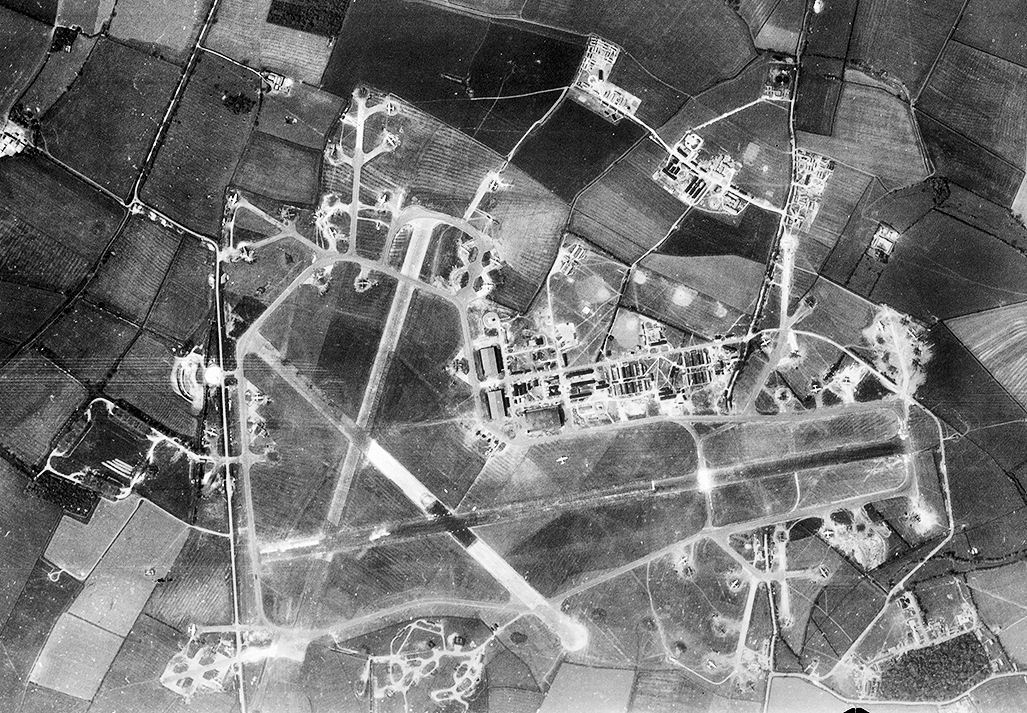
Aerial photograph of RAF Molesworth, 9 May 1944

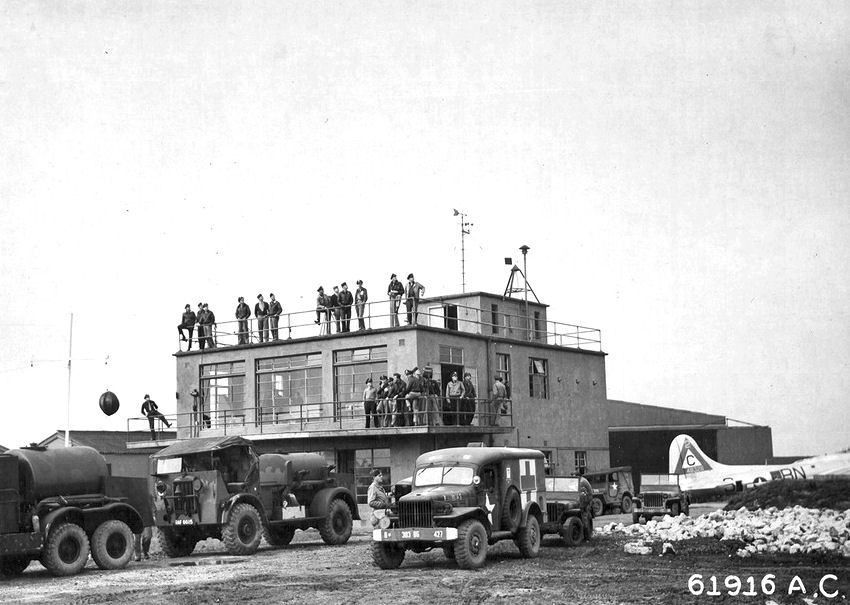
RAF Molesworth Control Tower, taken on 28 September 1944, with wing staff waiting on the return of the 303d Bombardment Group from a mission. Note Lockheed/Vega B-17G-60-VE Fortress 44-8328 359th Bombardment Squadron (Code BN) parked next to tower.

Molesworth was one of the early Eighth Air Force stations allocated to the United States Army Air Forces (USAAF). In February 1942 General Ira Eaker and four US staff members inspected Molesworth for possible American use, and during 1942 the facility was improved to Class A airfield standard, with all of its runways extended to American specifications for heavy 4-engined bombers. The main runway was lengthened to 2,000 yards and the number of hardstands increased to fifty. It was given USAAF designation as Station 107.

==== 15th Bombardment Squadron ====
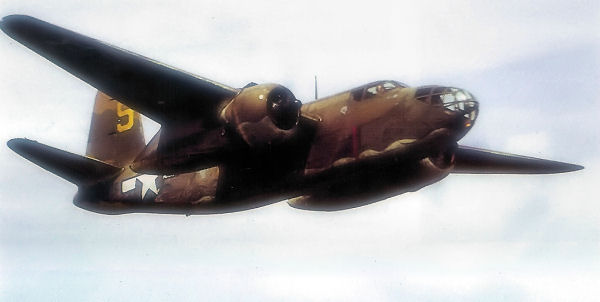
RDB-7B (RAF Douglas A-20C-1-DO Havoc Boston III), Serial AL672, shown as a staff communications aircraft for 8th AF HQ at RAF Bovingdon. This aircraft originally belonged to 15th Bombardment Squadron (Light) and was used on 4 July 1942 in a low-level attack on Luftwaffe airfields in the Netherlands.

The first USAAF tenant on Molesworth was the 15th Bombardment Squadron, arriving on 9 June 1942 from RAF Grafton Underwood. The squadron flew the Douglas Boston III (A-20) light bomber. The 15th was originally part of the 27th Bombardment Group (Light), assigned to Fifth Air Force in the Philippine Islands. However the group's planes did not arrive by 7 December 1941, and due to the deteriorating situation in the Philippines after the Japanese invasion, they were diverted to Australia. Surviving members of the group reformed into a combat unit in Australia and fought in the Dutch East Indies and New Guinea Campaigns. When the 27th Bombardment Group was inactivated and transferred back to the United States for re-equipping, the surviving members of the group were first transferred back to the United States, then to the UK in May where they received their Bostons from No. 226 Squadron RAF.

After a few weeks of familiarisation training with the new aircraft, on 4 July 1942, six American crews from the 15th Bomb Squadron joined with six RAF crews from RAF Swanton Morley for a low-level attack on Luftwaffe airfields in the Netherlands, becoming the first USAAF unit to bomb targets in Europe. The 4 July raid had been specifically ordered by General Henry H. "Hap" Arnold and approved by President Roosevelt. Arnold believed that 4 July would be an ideal day for the USAAF to open its strategic bombing campaign against the Nazis, but General Carl Spaatz did not have any of his heavy Eighth Air Force bomb groups ready for operational missions. Two of the 15th's planes did not return from the mission, along with one RAF aircraft. The plane of the squadron commander, Captain Charles Kegelman, was shot up badly and almost did not return after striking the ground. Spaatz considered the mission a "stunt" triggered by pressure in the American press who believed the people of both the United States and Great Britain needed a psychological boost. However, Kegelman was awarded the Distinguished Service Cross and its British equivalent for his valour on that Fourth of July mission, the first Eighth Air Force airman to receive the nation's second highest combat decoration.

The 15th flew most of its missions from Molesworth in its Bostons, and did not receive USAAF Douglas A-20 Havoc aircraft until 5 September. The squadron was transferred to RAF Podington until 15 September where it flew a few missions before being transferred to Twelfth Air Force for support of Allied landings in North Africa on 15 October 1942.

==== 303d Bombardment Group ====
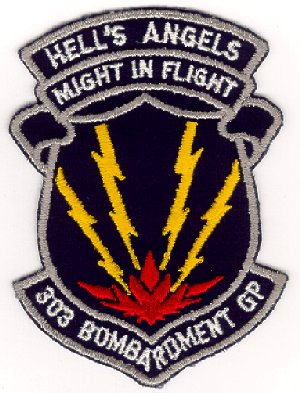

With the departure of the 15th Bomb Squadron, Molesworth was occupied by the Boeing B-17 Flying Fortresses of the 358th Bombardment Squadron, the first of four squadrons that would comprise the 303d Bombardment Group. The 303d Bombardment Group consisted of the following squadrons:

- 358th Bombardment Squadron (Code VK)
- 359th Bombardment Squadron (Code BN)
- 360th Bombardment Squadron (Code PU)
- 427th Bombardment Squadron (Code GN)

The 358th flew the first mission for the group on 17 November 1942. The group would become one of the legendary units of the Eighth Air Force. The 303d took part in the first penetration into Germany by heavy bombers of Eighth Air Force by striking the U-boat yard at Wilhelmshaven on 27 January 1943 then attacked other targets concentrated primarily on strategic bombardment of German industry, marshalling yards, and other strategic targets, including the ball bearing plants at Schweinfurt, shipyards at Bremen and an aircraft engine factory at Hamburg.

The 303d received a Distinguished Unit Citation for an operation on 11 January 1944 when, in spite of continuous attacks by enemy fighters in weather that prevented effective fighter cover from reaching the group, it successfully struck an aircraft assembly plant at Oschersleben.

The group attacked gun emplacements and bridges in the Pas-de-Calais during Operation Overlord, the invasion of Normandy, in June 1944; bombed enemy troops during Operation Cobra, the breakout at Saint Lo, and during the Battle of the Bulge. It bombed military installations near Wesel during Operation Lumberjack, the Allied assault across the Rhine. Its last combat mission was an attack on 25 April 1945 against an armament factory at Pilsen (now Plzeň).

On 31 May 1945, the 303d Bomb Group left Molesworth, moving to Casablanca, French Morocco. A monument to the 303rd BG stands inside the main entrance and is accessible to the public.

Bob Hope entertained base personnel on 6 July 1943. American news correspondent Walter Cronkite flew on a 303d Bombardment Group mission while reporting the war. American servicemen from RAF Molesworth married more English women during Second World War than servicemen from any other American base in England.

===== Wulfe Hound =====
A B-17F-27-BO from the 360th BS, nicknamed "Wulfe Hound" (41-24585; squadron code PU-B) was the first Flying Fortress to be captured by the Luftwaffe. On 12 December 1942, after attacking railroad marshalling yards in the Rouen-Sotteville area of France, "Wulfe Hound" was attacked by Focke-Wulf Fw 190 fighters. Damage forced the pilot, 1Lt Paul F. Flickenger to make a wheels-up landing in a hayfield near Melun (60 miles southeast of Paris). Four of the crew were captured but six managed to evade capture including 1Lt Gilbert T Showalter (navigator) and 2Lt Jack E. Williams (co-pilot) were able to evade capture. Flickinger and the bombardier were captured the same day. George Dillard, the ball turret gunner, and Kenneth J. Kurtenback, the tail gunner managed to evade capture for thirteen days, but were captured in Dijon on Christmas Day, 1942.

German personnel were able to transport the B-17 to Leeuwarden Air Base in the Netherlands where it was repaired and put in flyable condition. It was examined and tested at the Luftwaffe Test and Evaluation Center at Rechlin. "Wulfe Hound" was first flown by the Germans on 17 March 1943, followed by more testing and development of fighter tactics against B-17s. It was transferred to the Kampfgeschwader 200 special operations wing at Rangsdorf, Germany on 11 September 1943 and took part in training and clandestine missions between May and June 1944.

On 20 April 1945 the aircraft was caught in an Allied air-raid on Oranienburg airfield and was damaged. In 2000, the German government started redeveloping this former airfield and parts of "Wulfe Hound" were recovered and are preserved at Sachsenhausen Memorial Store.

=== USAF use ===
==== 582d Air Resupply Group ====
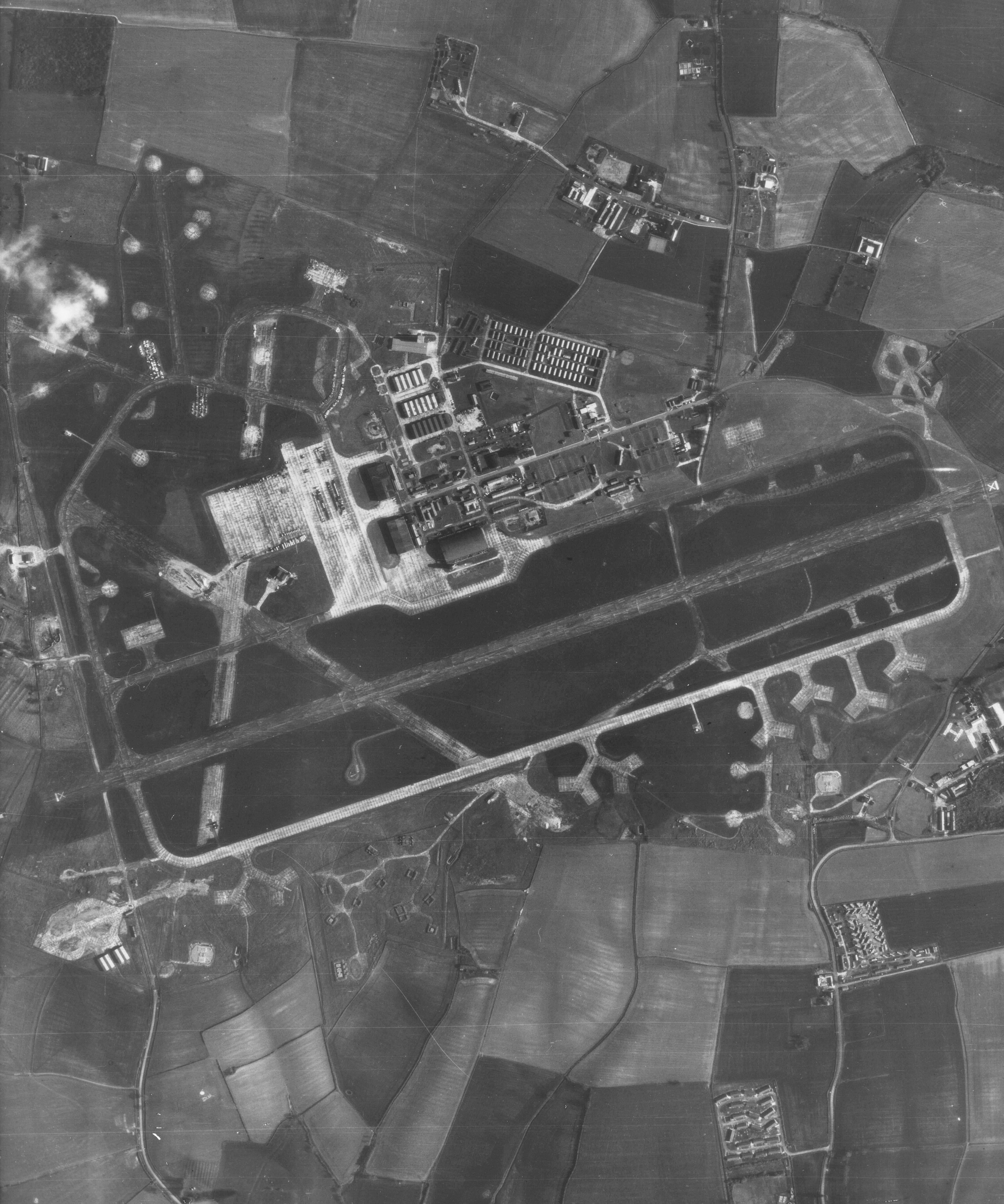
RAF Molesworth circa early to mid-1960s. With the arrival of the Cold War 582nd Resupply Group in 1953, the station was modernised with the construction of a 9,000 feet jet runway and permanent facilities, overlaid over the Second World War Eighth Air Force airfield. This configuration existed until about 1980.

RAF Molesworth was chosen in 1951 to become home to the 582d Air Resupply Group. The unit was equipped with twelve B-29s, four Grumman HU-16 Albatross, Amphibians, three C-119 Flying Boxcars (able to use RATO gear) and a C-47. The 582nd was assigned to the Third Air Force and provided the bulk of its air support to the Army 10th Special Forces Group. On 25 October 1956, the Air Resupply Group was reorganized and renamed the 42nd Troop Carrier Squadron. However, the squadron had a short life and was inactivated on 8 December 1957. With the departure of the 42d Troop Carrier Squadron, Molesworth was put into a standby status, with the occasional aircraft using the airfield: it was officially deactivated in 1973.

==== 303d Tactical Missile Wing and cruise missiles ====
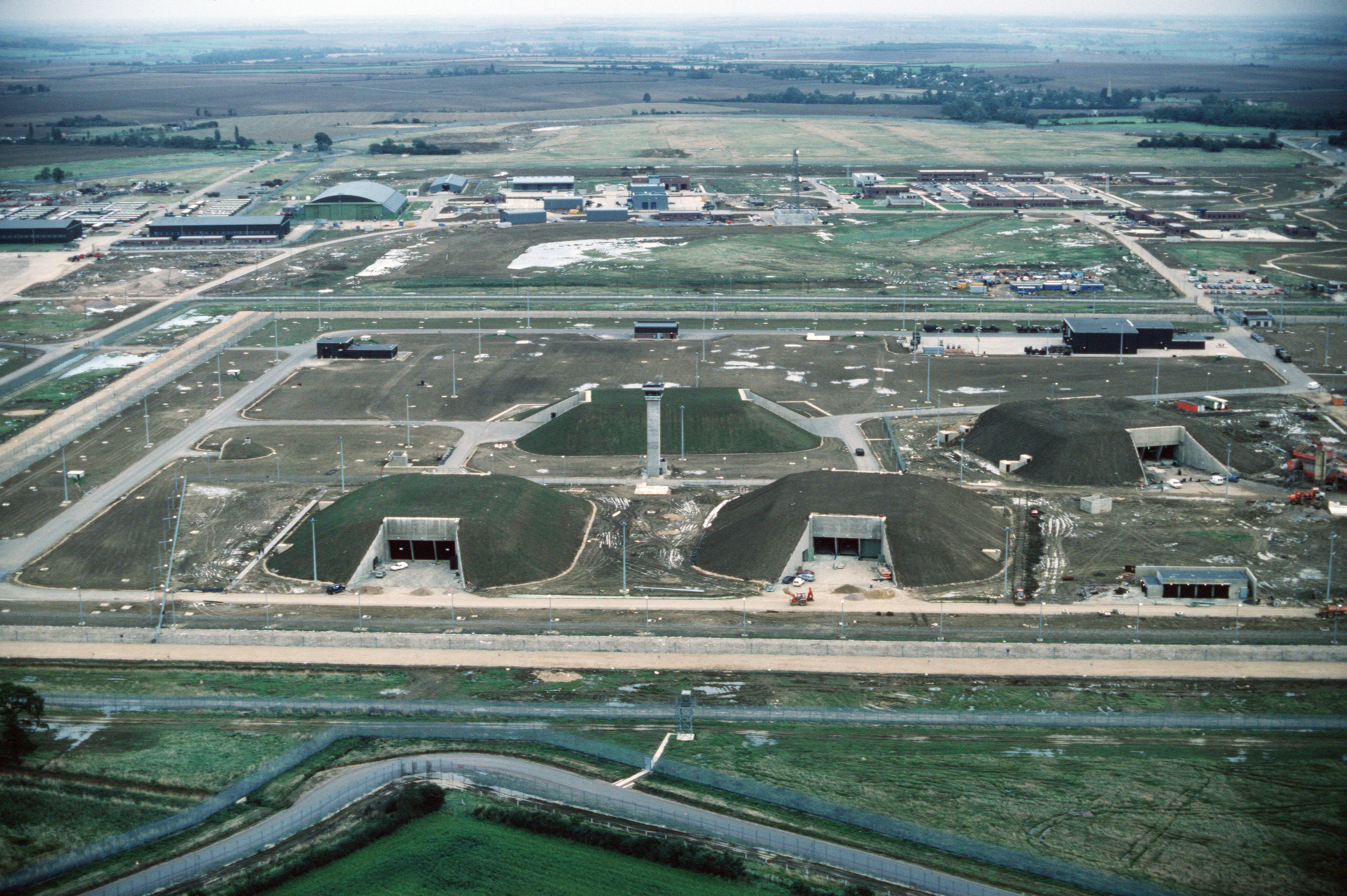
RAF Molesworth GLCM bunkers in 1989

Following the 1979 NATO Double-Track Decision, in June 1980, RAF Molesworth was selected as one of two British bases for the US Air Force's mobile nuclear armed Ground Launched Cruise Missiles or GLCMs. These were the "Gryphon" type derived from the sea-launched "Tomahawk". The majority of GLCMs were deployed at RAF Greenham Common, the other UK base.

During the early 1980s, the Ministry of Defence rebuilt Molesworth. All of the Second World War runways, taxiways, hardstands, as well as a 9,000 ft jet runway laid down in the 1950s were removed. The only surviving remnants of the Second World War era are two T.2 hangars and one J-Type hangar on the former airfield. A cluster of wartime buildings, including Nissen huts exist just east of the facility, at the intersection of the B660 and Brington Road at the edge of Old Weston. Crumbling buildings, mostly from the 1950s were also demolished and removed. In its place an infrastructure to accommodate nuclear missiles (storage bunkers, watch tower, machine guns pits) was built. Each of the four bunkers contained three bays housing one BGM-109G Ground Launched Cruise Missile Transporter Erector Launcher (TEL) and sixteen missiles, and two launch control centres and a MAN KAT1 8x8 tractor. As Molesworth no longer had a runway, the missiles were flown in and out of Alconbury before being transferred by road to and from Molesworth.

On 12 December 1986 the 303d Tactical Missile Wing was activated. However, the missiles and the wing did not stay long; the United States and the Soviet Union signed the Intermediate-Range Nuclear Forces Treaty in 1987 which led to the removal of all nuclear missiles from the station by October 1988. The 303d TMW was inactivated on 30 January 1989.

The infrastructure from the GAMA (GLCM Alert and Maintenance Area) is partially intact.

==== Joint Analysis Center ====
On 11 January 1990 the RAF announced construction would begin later that year to house the United States European Command's new intelligence analysis centre. This facility would become known as the Joint Analysis Center (JAC).

A 2017 Office of the Inspector General report recorded that the base also housed other similar units: U.S. Africa Command (AFRICOM) Directorate for Intelligence unit (J2-M), Defense Intelligence Agency's Regional Support Center, NATO's Intelligence Fusion Center, the Regional Joint Intelligence Training Facility, and the Under Secretary of Defense for Intelligence's Battlefield Information Collection and Exploitation System (BICES) unit. The Joint Analysis Center and AFRICOM J-2M employed about 460 U.S. military personnel and Department of Defence civilians.

In July 2023, it was announced that the Defence Infrastructure Organisation (DIO), acting on behalf of the U.S. Air Force, had awarded a contract to deliver European Infrastructure Consolidation (EIC) works at the base, to support US Visiting Forces. The two-storey facility, with supporting infrastructure and warehouse, was expected to be completed in 2028.

Two Latvian men, aged 36 and 32 and living in the UK, were arrested inside the base's perimeter a few hours after searches found a small breach of the fence at the site on 8 October 2026. They were charged under Section 4 of the National Security Act, and subsequently bailed.

==== Planned station closure ====
On 8 January 2015 the UK Ministry of Defence announced that the US Air Force activities at RAF Molesworth and RAF Alconbury would be consolidated at RAF Croughton in Northamptonshire. An announcement, in early 2016, stated that the site was one of twelve that will be sold as part of the strategy for the MOD Estate, although no date for the sale was given. In February 2019 the Ministry of Defence announced that RAF Molesworth would be retained.

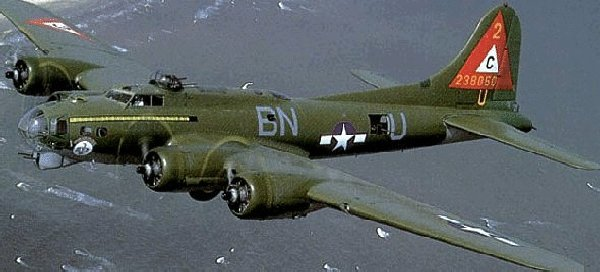
B-17G-25-DL Fortress 42-38050 Thunderbird, 359th BS

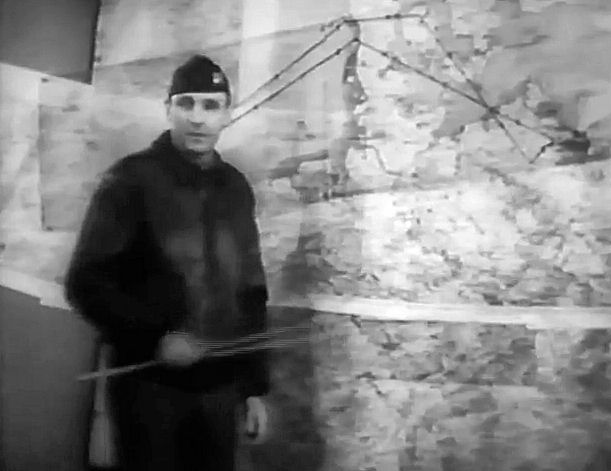
Pre-mission briefing, 9 October 1944 prior to 303d Bomb Group raid on Anklam, Germany to attack the Arado aircraft component plant

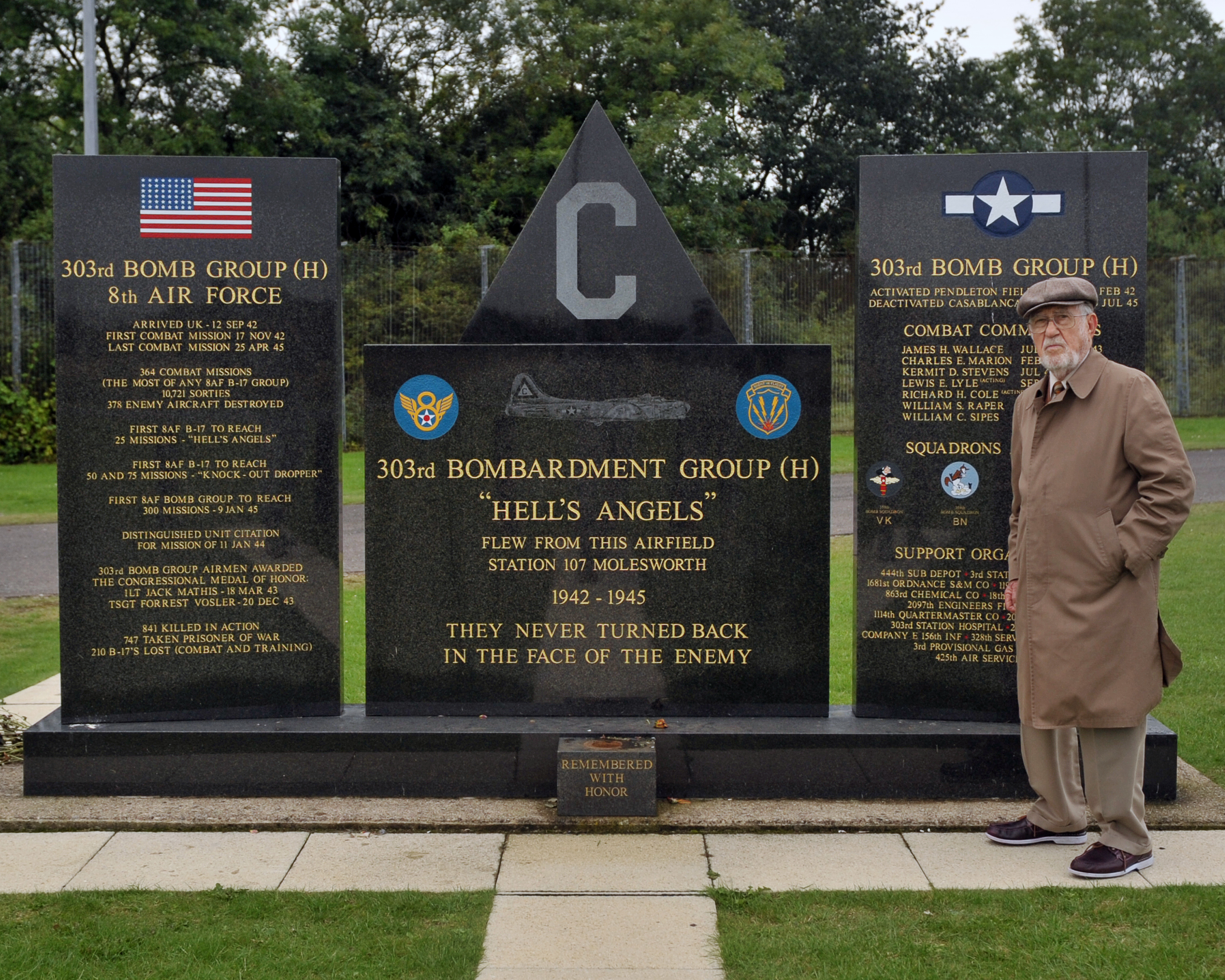
The memorial in 2012 with Lt. Col. Albert Levin. He flew 35 missions as a B-17 navigator from RAF Molesworth from 1944 to 1945

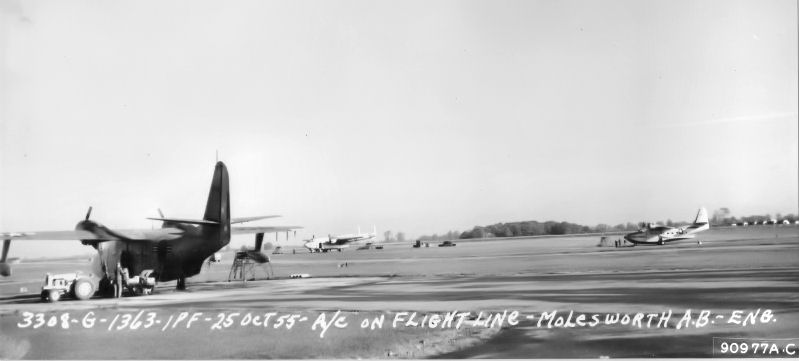
HU-16 Albatrosses of the 582d Air Resupply Group - 25 October 1955

== Based units ==
Notable units based at RAF Molesworth.

=== United States Air Force ===
  - US Air Forces in Europe - Air Forces Africa (USAFE-AFAFRICA)
    - Third Air Force
      - 501st Combat Support Wing
        - 423rd Air Base Group
          - Various elements

=== Defense Intelligence Agency ===
  - Joint Intelligence Operations Center Europe (JIOCEUR) Analytic Center

=== Department of Defense ===
  - US Africa Command (USAFRICOM)
    - Intelligence and Knowledge Directorate-Molesworth (J2-M)

=== NATO ===
  - NATO Intelligence Fusion Centre (NIFC)

== Anti-nuclear protests ==
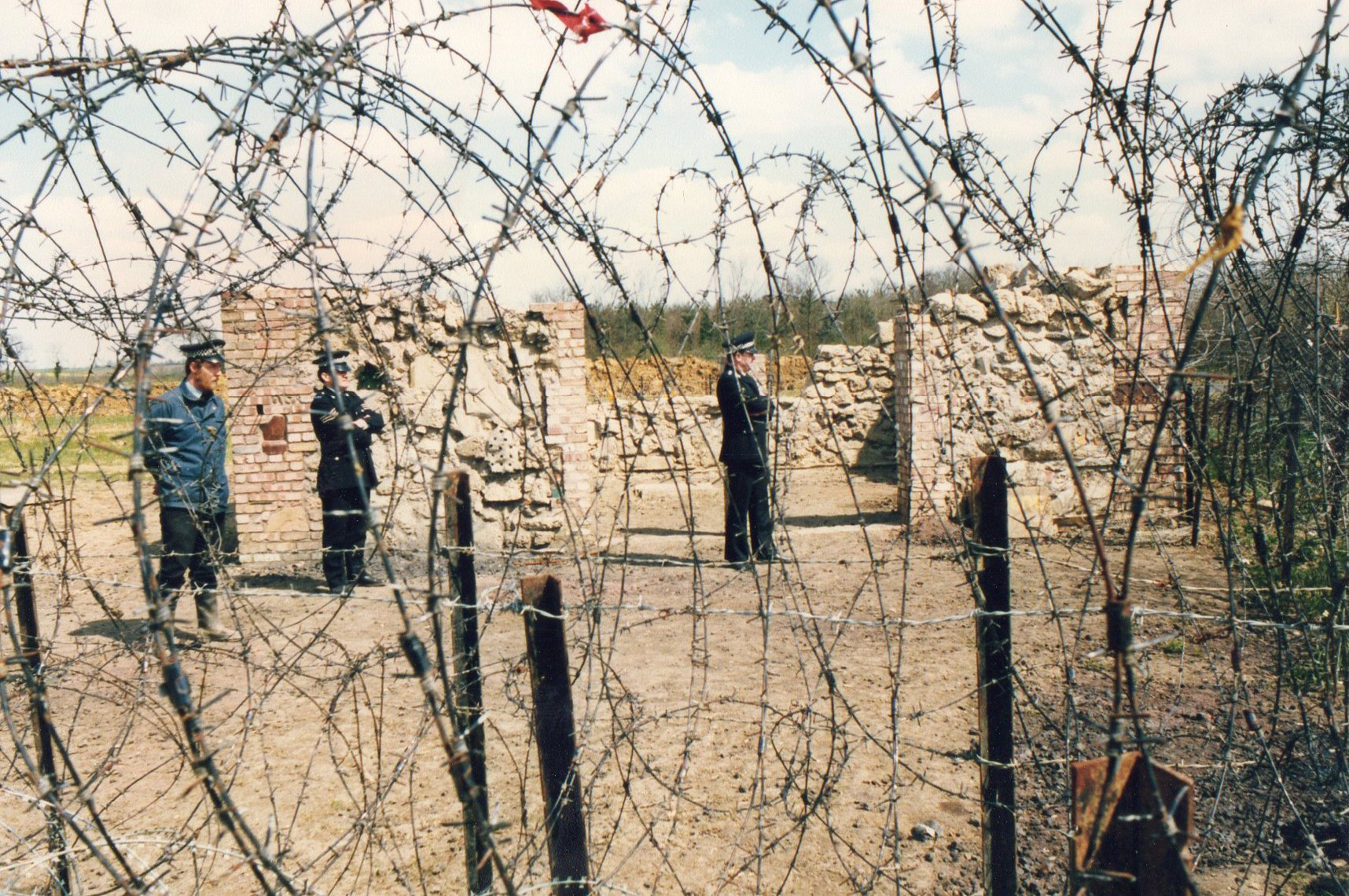
Police in front of remains of peace chapel, c. 1985

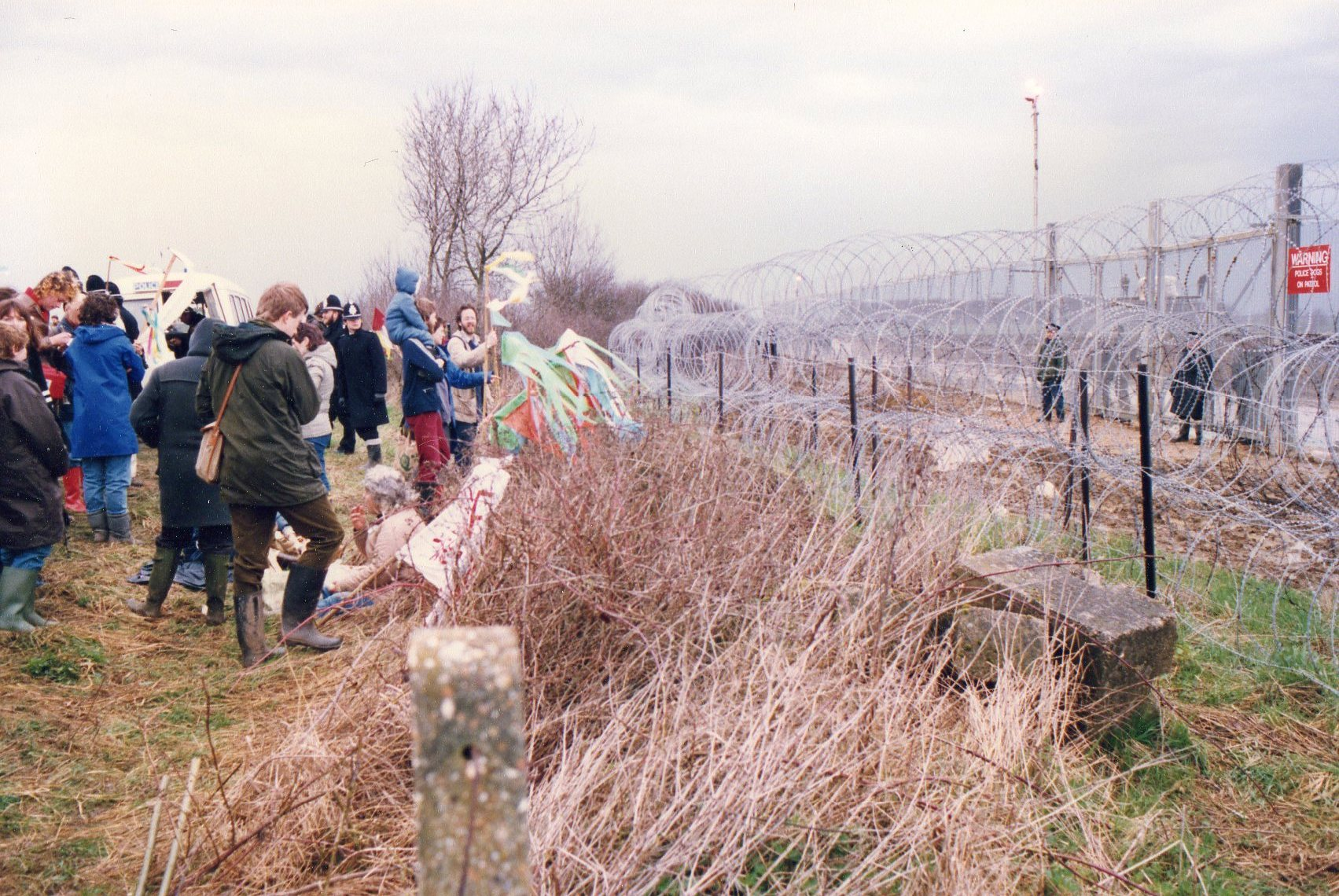
Demonstrators outside the wire fences

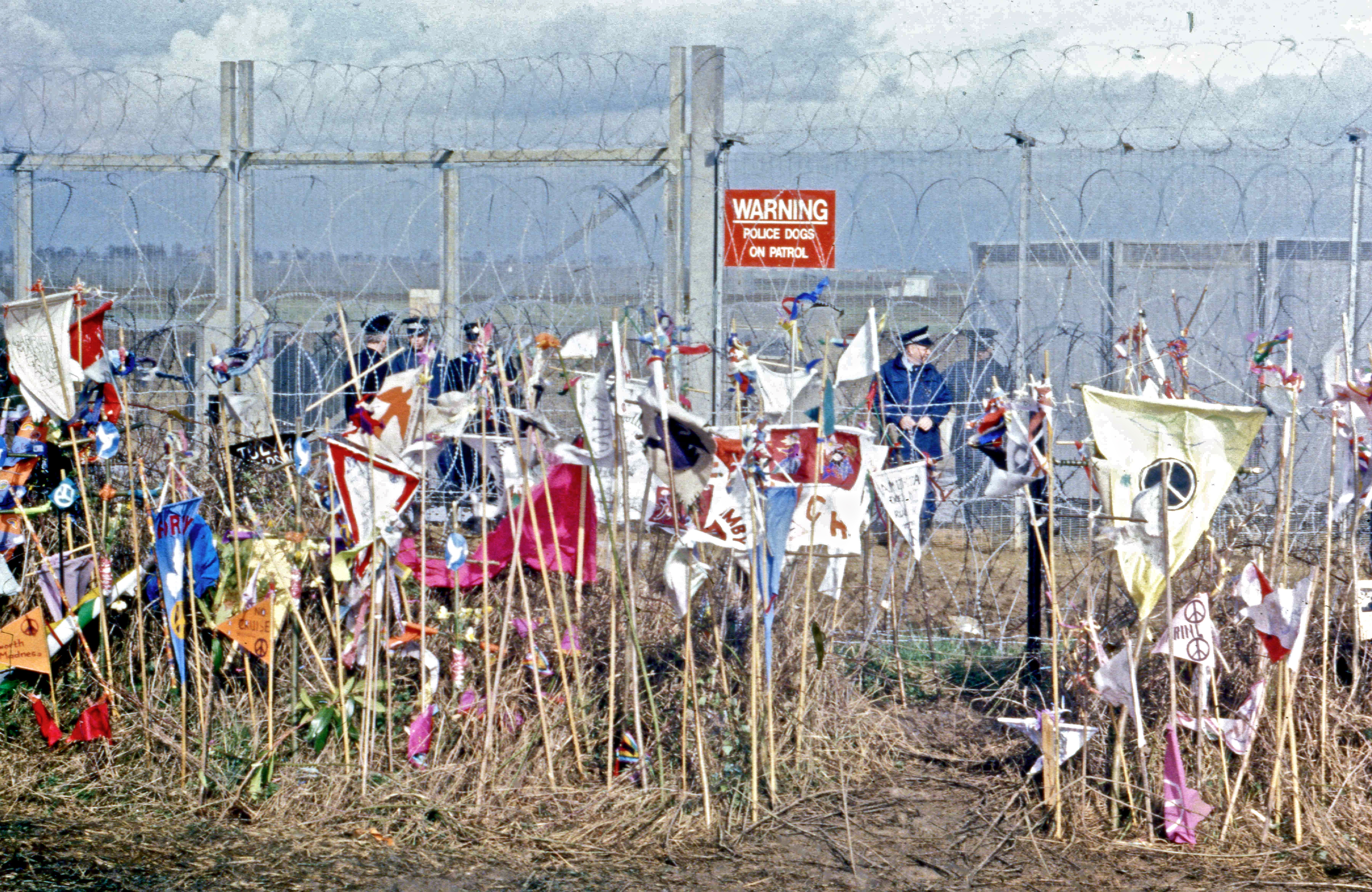
8 April 1985 CND placards against the Molesworth fence

The decision in 1980 to house 64 cruise missiles at Molesworth made the station a focus of protest. In May 1981, members of the Fellowship of Reconciliation, a peace organisation on a cycle pilgrimage from Iona Abbey to Canterbury Cathedral called at the unfenced base. The Bishop of Huntingdon, Gordon Roe planted a cherry tree. On Holy Innocents Day, 28 December 1981 members of the Fellowship of Reconciliation, Christian CND, Green CND and others established a peace camp at the south-east gate of the station to protest against the planned deployment.

Unlike Greenham Common Women's Peace Camp, Molesworth People's Peace Camp included both women and men. The Christian (particularly Quaker) presence at the Camp remained throughout its existence and was supplemented by people of other faiths and of none. An all-faiths chapel, a mainly wood structure called Eirene (Greek for 'peace') was gifted by Architects For Peace.

The People's Peace Camp was mainly established by what became known as Peace Corner which opened on to the base and a disused loop of the B660. This camp was evicted in July 1983 but was re-established along Warren Lane bridleway to the west of the station.

The original Eirene Chapel was removed but a new one was started on the base, using rubble from the old runway, brick and other material. The foundation stone was laid by Satish Kumar on Easter Sunday 1984. It was never completed.

In August 1984, part of the then-unfenced airfield was occupied by a mixed group of environmental activists, New Age travellers, Quakers, anarchists and peace campers. The occupation, and the 'Rainbow Village' that it became, remained on MOD land for nearly six months. A magazine Molesworth Bulletin was printed in a bender. The members of Rainbow Village and peace activists used an area of land to grow wheat which was later sent to Eritrea.

On 6 February 1985, 1,500 troops and police were deployed to secure the seven-mile station perimeter for the Ministry of Defence. The operation has been described as "perhaps the most dramatic occurrence in all the peace and anti-nuclear campaigns of the 1980s" in the UK. The troops had been training for weeks in the rapid deployment of a three-metre-high (9.8-foot), six-roll, Dannert wire fence behind which a 5-metre-wide (16 ft) no-man's-land concrete roadway was constructed along the line of the fence, and a 10-foot-high (3.0 m), Weldmesh steel fence was erected beyond that. Floodlights were installed every 100 yards, and Ministry of Defence Police and armed guards were to patrol the fence, 24 hours a day. Secretary of State for Defence Michael Heseltine arrived by RAF helicopter, wearing a camouflage jacket over his suit. The roads around the station were blocked by lorries carrying construction materials and fencing. The cost of the operation to clear and fence RAF Molesworth was in the order of £6.5 million.

The only structure left on military land was the Eirene Peace Chapel which had been started by Tim and Bridie Wallis. This was fenced off by the military authorities and was demolished on 14 April 1986. In later years, the Peace Garden was maintained on an ad hoc basis by a network of Molesworth gardeners. A memorial sign was erected in 1999 and replaced in June 2019.

== See also ==
- List of Royal Air Force stations
- Forrest L. Vosler, (1923 - 1992) recipient of the Medal of Honor
