= Croughton, Northamptonshire =

Village and civil parish in England

Coordinates: 51.99729°N 1.20906°W

Croughton
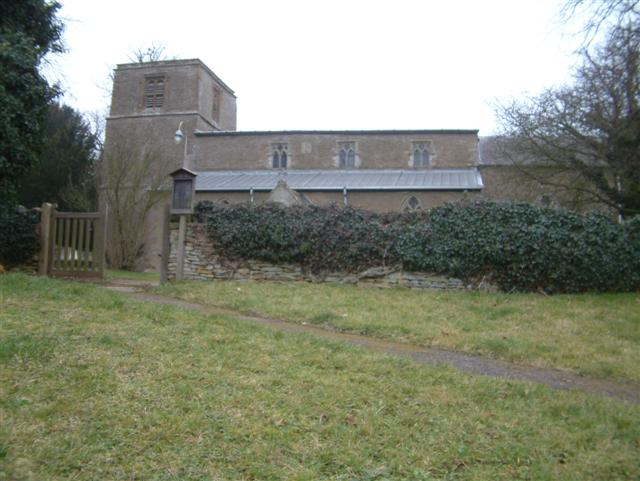
- All Saints' parish church

- Location within Northamptonshire
- Population: 992 (2011 census)
- OS grid reference: SP544335
  - London: 68 miles (109 km) SE
- Civil parish: Croughton
- Unitary authority: West Northamptonshire
- Ceremonial county: Northamptonshire
- Region: East Midlands
- Country: England
- Sovereign state: United Kingdom
- Post town: Brackley
- Postcode district: NN13
- Dialling code: 01869
- Police: Northamptonshire
- Fire: Northamptonshire
- Ambulance: East Midlands
- UK Parliament: South Northamptonshire
- Website: Croughton Parish Council

Croughton is a village and civil parish in West Northamptonshire, England, about 3 miles (5 km) southwest of Brackley. The 2011 census recorded the parish's population as 992.

The village is on the B4031 road, about 390 feet (120 m) above sea level, on the south side of an east–west ridge. The parish is 1 1/2 miles (2.4 km) wide east–west and 2 1/2 miles (4 km) wide north–south. Its southern boundary is Ockley Brook, which also forms part of the county boundary with Oxfordshire. Ockley Brook is a tributary of the River Cherwell. Croughton is Northamptonshire's second-most southerly village, second only to neighbouring Aynho.

== Place-name ==
No single pronunciation of the place name predominates. Residents pronounce its first syllable to rhyme with "bough" or "though" (i.e., /ˈkraʊtən/ or /ˈkroʊtən/).

The Domesday Book of 1086 records the name as Creveltone and Criweltone. 12th-century versions include Crouelton, followed by Craulton and Crewelton in a pipe roll of 1198, and Croulton in an Assize Roll of 1202. It is derived from Old English. Crawil or krawil may mean "fork". Two streams flow either side of the village, converging just southwest of it and then joining Ockley Brook. Hence, "Croughton" may mean "town in the fork of a river".

== Archaeology ==
About 1 mile (1.6 km) north of the village is the site of a Roman settlement. It is a scheduled monument.

== Parish church ==
The oldest parts of the Church of England parish church of All Saints are 12th-century Norman. They include the arch of the west tower and the three-bay north arcade. The south arcade, also of three bays, is 13th-century Early English Gothic.

In the 14th century, new windows were inserted, the clerestory was rebuilt, and north and south porches were added. The font was Romanesque but was re-cut in the 14th or 15th century. In the 14th century, a series of murals were painted inside the church, including numerous scenes from the life of Jesus and a Doom painting. The wall paintings were painted over during the Reformation in the 16th century but were rediscovered in 1921 and restored in 1960. The pulpit is 17th-century. All Saints is a Grade I-listed building.

The west tower of All Saints has a ring of five bells. All were cast and hung by John Taylor & Co of Loughborough in 1923.

In All Saints' churchyard, southeast of the chancel, are the base and broken shaft of a medieval stone cross. An historic elm reputedly stood in the churchyard for 800 years. It is believed to have died of Dutch elm disease in the 1970s, but its demise was in the early 1900s.

== RAF Croughton ==
RAF Croughton is partly in the parish, about 2 miles (3 km) southeast of the village. It was a Royal Air Force training base and emergency landing field from 1939 until 1950, when it was transferred to the United States Air Force for use as a communications centre.

== Amenities ==
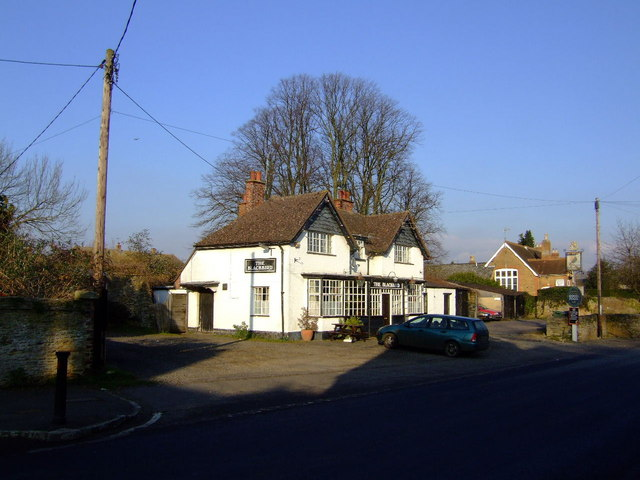
The Blackbird pub

Croughton All Saints Primary School is on the High Street of the village.

The village has a pub, the Blackbird.

== Notable people ==
- Robert Freind (1667–1751), sometime headmaster of Westminster School
- Charles Masson (1800–1853), explorer and archaeologist

== General bibliography ==
- Ekwall, Eilert (1960) [1936]. Concise Oxford Dictionary of English Place-Names (4th ed.). Oxford: Oxford University Press. Croughton. ISBN 0198691033.
- Pevsner, Nikolaus; Cherry, Bridget (revision) (1973) [1961]. Northamptonshire. The Buildings of England (2nd ed.). Harmondsworth: Penguin Books. pp. 170–171. ISBN 0-14-071022-1.
- RCHME, ed. (1982). "Croughton". An Inventory of the Historical Monuments in the County of Northamptonshire. Vol. 4 – Archaeological sites in South-West Northamptonshire. London: Royal Commission on the Historical Monuments of England. pp. 38–39.
- Whellan, Francis (1874). History, Topography, and Directory of Northamptonshire. London: Whittaker. p. 476.
