= European Infrastructure Consolidation =

The European Infrastructure Consolidation is a base closure process of the United States Department of Defense which focuses on restructuring forces in Europe. While similar to the Base Realignment and Closure process in the mainland United States, the process is generally easier due to members of Congress not fighting to save bases in their home districts and states.

== See also ==
- Base Realignment and Closure
