= NATO Intelligence Fusion Centre =

NATO's military intelligence organization

NATO Intelligence Fusion Centre emblem

The NATO Intelligence Fusion Centre (NIFC) is a multinational military intelligence organisation of NATO, headquartered at RAF Molesworth, England. It reports operationally to the Supreme Allied Commander Europe (SACEUR) and has provided timely, relevant, and accurate intelligence in support of NATO operations since December 2007.

Established in 2006 by the NATO Military Committee as a military-led, US-sponsored Memorandum of Understanding organisation, the NIFC serves as a central hub for the collection, fusion, and dissemination of intelligence from national and international sources to enhance the alliance's situational awareness. Operating continuously 24 hours a day and seven days a week, the fusion centre employs over 200 personnel from 28 NATO member states and three non-NATO countries, supporting NATO operations on three continents, including specialized intelligence support for NATO Special Operations Forces.

== Background ==
=== Strategic context ===
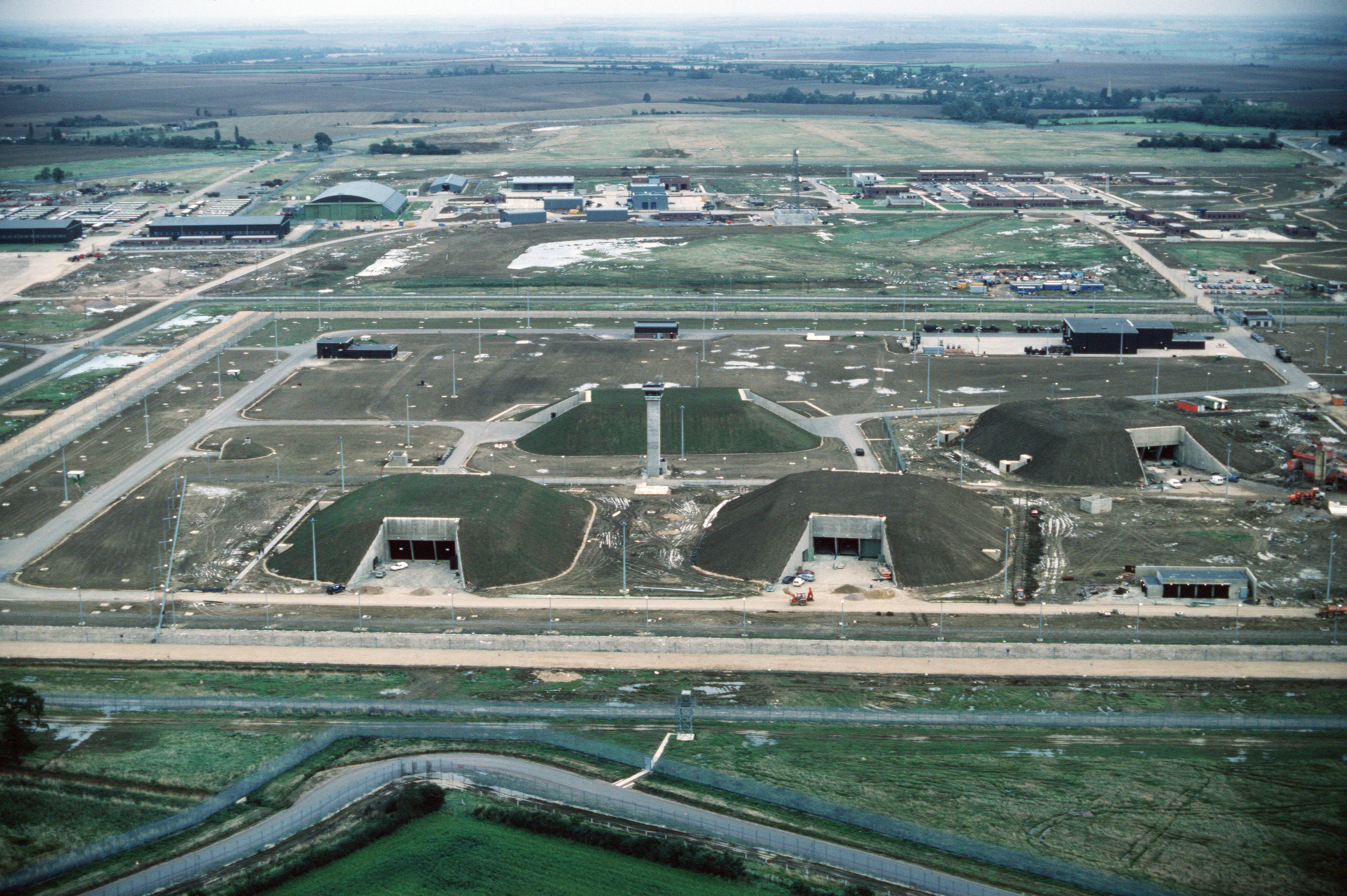
RAF Molesworth missile site in 1989, now the site of the NIFC

The creation of the NIFC is inextricably linked to the development of the US and NATO intelligence architecture in Europe after World War II. The RAF Molesworth site in Molesworth, Cambridgeshire, England, has a long military history, beginning during World War II as a base for the 303rd Bombardment Group of the United States Army Air Forces (USAAF). After a varied history as a missile site for BGM-109G Gryphon cruise missiles in the 1980s, the base became available for new uses after the end of the Cold War.

The decisive shift in U.S. defense policy came with the Goldwater-Nichols Department of Defense Reorganization Act of 1986, which strengthened the powers of unified commands and mandated the consolidation of intelligence capabilities. The Defense Intelligence Restructuring Initiative of 1991 required commanders of unified commands to consolidate existing intelligence activities into regional Joint Intelligence Centres. These structural changes, combined with the end of the Cold War and the resulting budget cuts, created the conditions for the establishment of innovative intelligence solutions.

=== Development ===
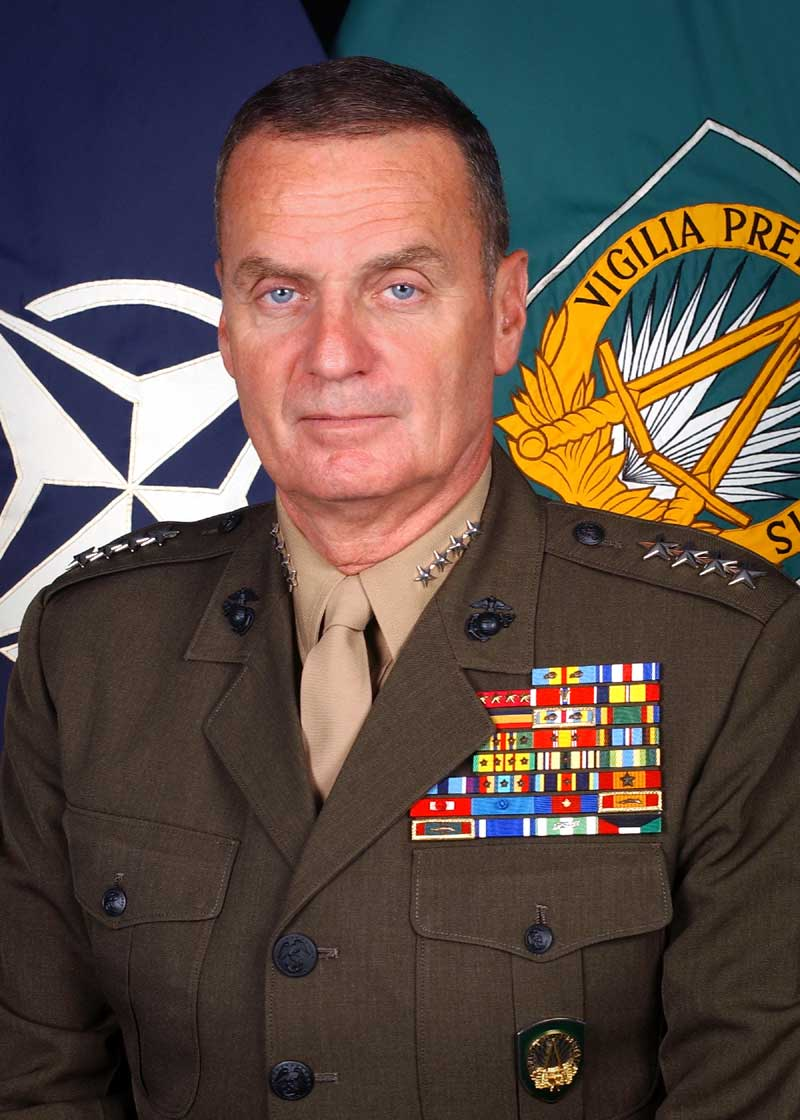
General James L. Jones (SACEUR) spearheaded the founding of the NIFC (2005)

The Joint Analysis Centre (JAC) was established in Molesworth on 1 October 1991 and formed the institutional basis for the subsequent development of the NIFC. This decision was pragmatically motivated: Molesworth had modern security facilities, an isolated location to minimize threats, and sufficient infrastructure for intelligence operations. The British government supported this development, although it requested a name change from "Joint Intelligence Centre" to "Joint Analysis Centre" to avoid confusion with the Joint Intelligence Committee, which had existed since the Second World War.

The real breakthrough for the NIFC came after the September 11 attacks, which led to a fundamental reorientation of NATO security policy. Experiences from the Yugoslav Wars of the 1990s had already revealed shortcomings in NATO intelligence cooperation, particularly the inadequate coordination between national intelligence services and the lack of a common intelligence culture. The Prague NATO Summit in 2002 provided the mandate to modernize NATO structures and improve capabilities to address new operational challenges.

The NATO Intelligence Fusion Centre (NIFC) was finally established in Molesworth in 2006, with the United States acting as the framework nation and the United Kingdom as the host nation. General James L. Jones, then Supreme Allied Commander Europe (SACEUR; 2003–2006), is credited as the driving force behind the creation of the NIFC. The organisation was conceived as a military-led, US-sponsored Memorandum of Understanding organisation, authorized by the NATO Military Committee.

=== Commissioning ===
The NIFC became fully operational in December 2007. Over the following decade, the organization grew from a small multinational unit into a comprehensive intelligence organization with over 200 staff members from 26 NATO member states and one non-NATO state approved by the North Atlantic Council. This expansion reflected both the growing operational requirements of the alliance and the increasing willingness of member states to invest in multilateral intelligence cooperation. As of September 2025, the organization consists of 28 NATO member states and three non-NATO states.

== Organizational structure ==
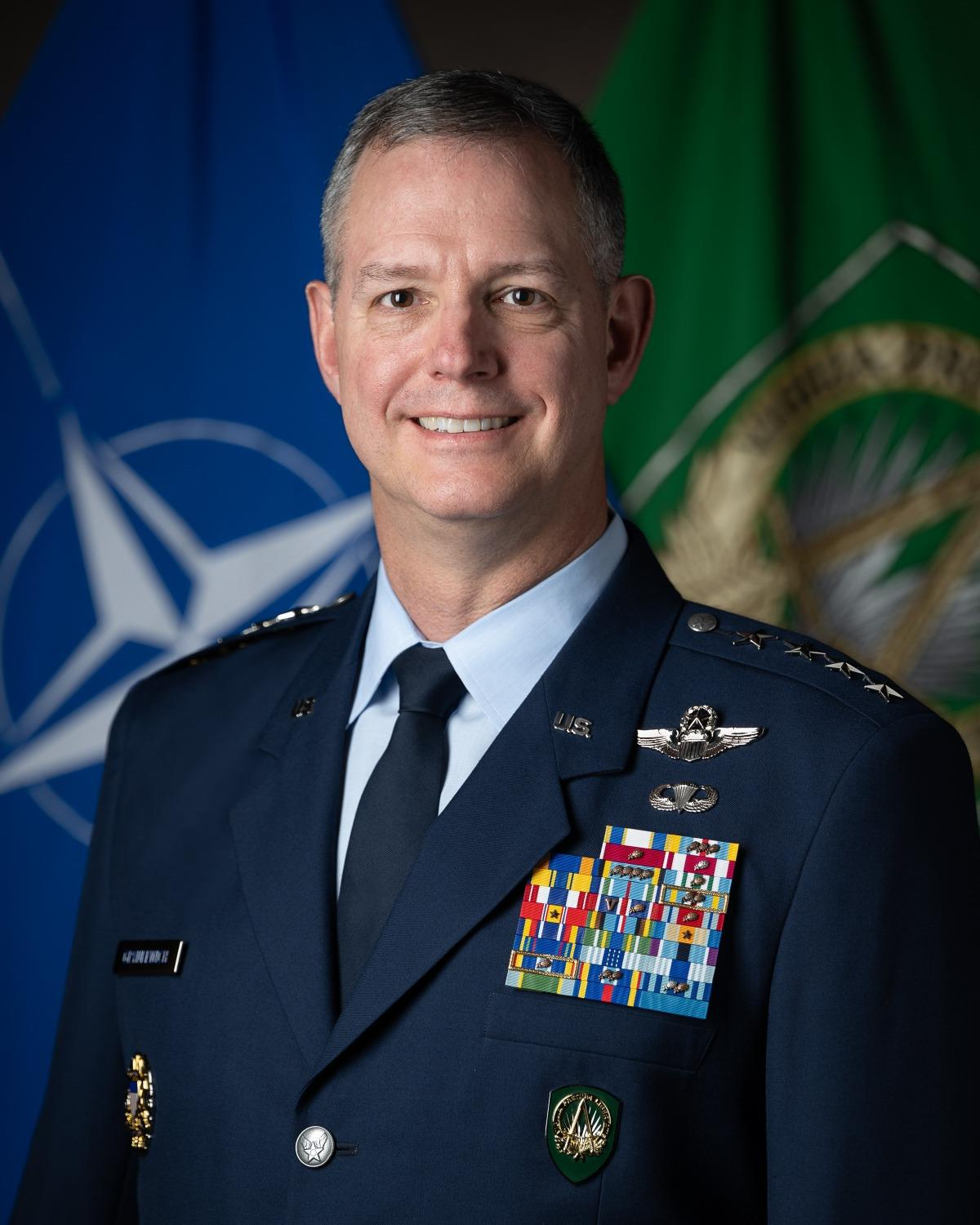
General Alexus Grynkewich (SACEUR), operational commander of the NIFC since July 1, 2025

The NIFC is under the operational command of the Supreme Allied Commander Europe (SACEUR), General Alexus G. Grynkewich since July 1, 2025, via the Assistant Chief of Staff for Intelligence at Supreme Headquarters Allied Powers Europe (SHAPE). This direct subordination to SACEUR underscores the organization's strategic importance for NATO operations and ensures the seamless integration of intelligence findings into the alliance's decision-making processes. The NIFC's unique position within the NATO structure lies in its positioning outside of national and international command structures, while simultaneously providing direct support to SHAPE's J2 Division (Intelligence) and the Comprehensive Crisis and Operations Management Centre (CCOMC). This structure allows for both the forward deployment of NIFC elements and the provision of reach-back support for deployed NATO forces.

The personnel structure of the NIFC reflects the multinational nature of the NATO alliance. As of September 2025, the organization comprises representatives from 28 NATO nations and three non-NATO states. Little is known about the participants or information providers at the NIFC. Not all NATO members provide information as a matter of course. For example, Albania only joined the Center in 2010, and the non-NATO members Japan, Australia, and South Africa are considered "close allies." Other bodies include the National Military Command Center of the Pentagon, the Emergency Conference Room (also at the Pentagon), and the National Counterterrorism Center. This broad representation allows for the integration of various national intelligence traditions, capabilities, and perspectives within a common operational framework. The NIFC operates on a continuous readiness basis and is staffed 24 hours a day, seven days a week. This constant availability is essential for supporting NATO operations on three continents and providing time-critical intelligence assessments. The organization has a broad range of intelligence disciplines and utilizes both national data collection capacities and the extensive military and civilian intelligence expertise of its staff.

The NIFC is embedded in a complex network of NATO intelligence structures. At the strategic level, it works closely with the Joint Intelligence and Security Division (JISD) at NATO Headquarters, which was established in 2016 under the leadership of the first Assistant Secretary General for Intelligence and Security, Arndt Freiherr Freytag von Loringhoven. This integration is part of a broader reform of NATO's intelligence architecture, which aims to unify civilian and military intelligence pillars and reduce duplication. At the operational level, the NIFC supports the Allied Joint Force Commands in Naples and Brunssum as well as various multinational units. Its colocation with the Joint Analysis Center (JAC) in Molesworth enables close cooperation between NATO and US analysts and access to robust communications infrastructure.

The Commander of the NIFC is appointed by SACEUR and leads the facility as its military commander. He reports directly to the Assistant Chief of Staff for Intelligence at SHAPE and has overall responsibility for the centre's personnel, operations, and strategic direction. Since June 2024, Colonel Ty S. Gilbert (US Air Force) has held this position. Under his leadership, the NIFC comprises a multidisciplinary staff that works closely with national intelligence agencies, NATO staff units, and international partners to ensure continuous operational readiness.

== Core tasks ==
The NIFC provides intelligence to Allied Command Operations (ACO) and the Supreme Allied Commander Europe (SACEUR) to support NATO operational planning, execution, deterrence, and defense. It collects, fuses, and disseminates multi-source information from classified and open sources provided by participating nations. This data integration generates operational and strategic situational awareness, threat assessments, strategic foresight, and operational support, including for NATO Special Operations Forces.

The NIFC provides strategic information on operational theaters, compiled from various sources, upon request from US or NATO command posts. It also identifies gaps in information and makes recommendations for improving information processing. The NIFC also supports electronic warfare, including cyber defense and attack, with planning data and technical expertise, also known as C^{4}ISTAR.

Another focus is on early warning and crisis response. Continuous monitoring of global developments allows the NIFC to proactively provide recommendations to decision-makers regarding emerging security challenges. The NIFC works closely with national analysis centers, academic institutions, think tanks, and international and private organizations to ensure a deep understanding of relevant intelligence issues.

== Experiences ==
=== Afghanistan deployment ===
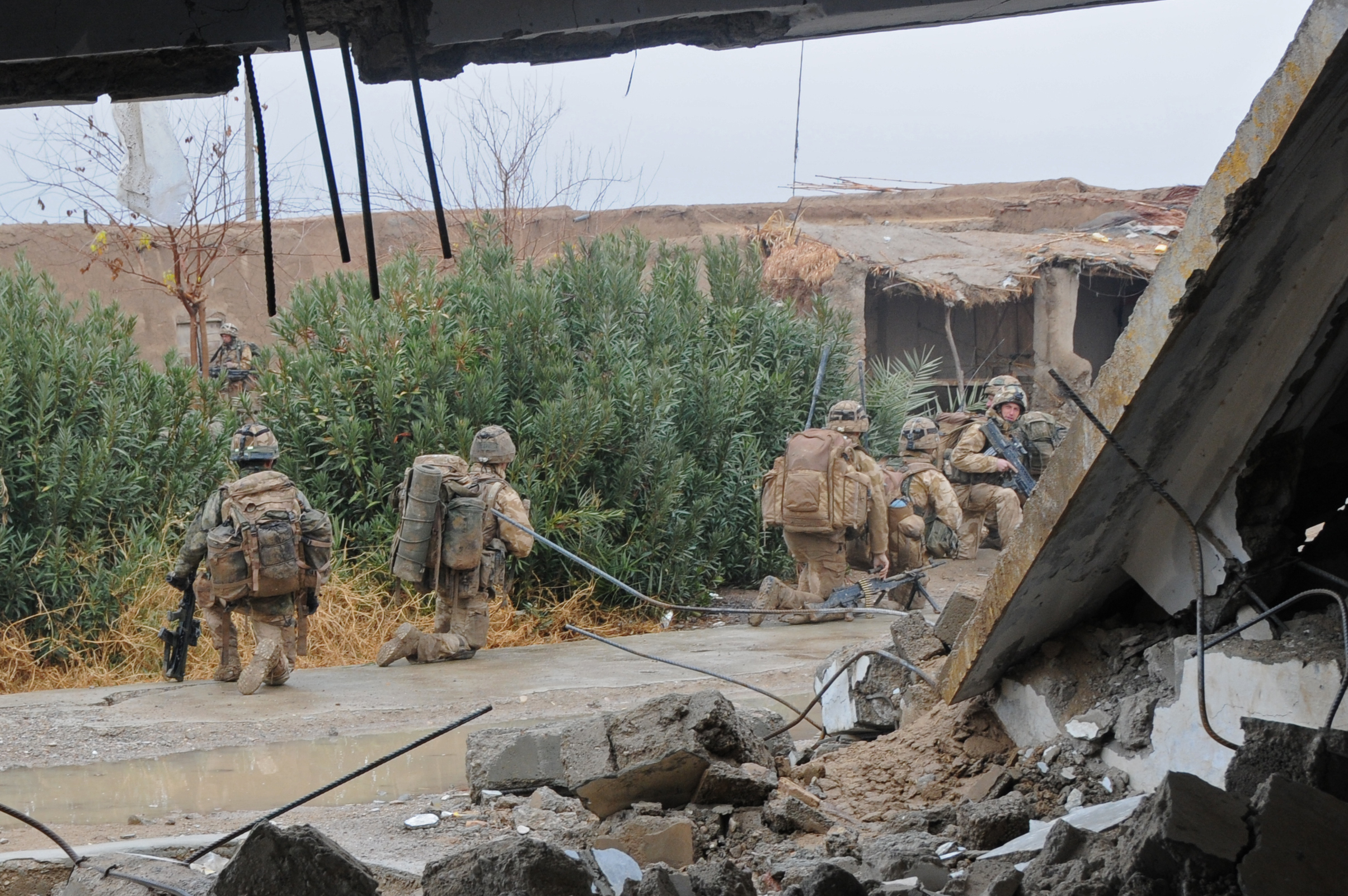
British units during NATO ISAF Operation Red Dagger in Afghanistan, 2008

The International Security Assistance Force (ISAF) in Afghanistan was one of NATO's longest and most complex operations, providing the NIFC with extensive opportunities to test and develop its capabilities under real-world operational conditions. The experiences in Afghanistan highlighted both the strengths and challenges of multilateral intelligence cooperation in asymmetric conflicts. The NIFC supported ISAF operations by providing cultural, social, and demographic analyses that went beyond traditional military targeting. This broader approach reflected the understanding that modern conflicts cannot be won solely by destroying enemy forces but require persuading the population. Cooperation with the ISAF SOF Fusion Cell in Kabul demonstrated the NIFC's ability to integrate into complex multinational command structures.

=== Libya Operation ===
The 2011 NATO operation "Unified Protector" in Libya represented an important test of the alliance's intelligence cooperation capabilities. The NIFC played a crucial role in providing intelligence support for the air campaign against the Gaddafi regime, demonstrating both its analytical capabilities and the challenges of time-sensitive information delivery. The operation in Libya highlighted the importance of precise intelligence support for protecting civilians and minimizing collateral damage. The NIFC contributed to the development of targeted strike lists and assisted commanders in assessing the effectiveness of airstrikes. At the same time, the operation revealed challenges in the speed of information sharing between different alliance partners, particularly between French and American intelligence services.

=== Further operations ===
The NIFC has demonstrated its capabilities in various other NATO operations, including deployments to the Horn of Africa, anti-piracy operations, and various crisis response missions. This experience has contributed to the continuous refinement of operational procedures and the improvement of interoperability with national and international partners. Supporting NATO Special Operations Forces is a particular focus of the NIFC's activities. These highly specialized units require time-critical, precise intelligence support that often goes beyond traditional military information requirements. The NIFC has developed specialized procedures and capabilities to meet these demanding requirements.

== Technical infrastructure ==
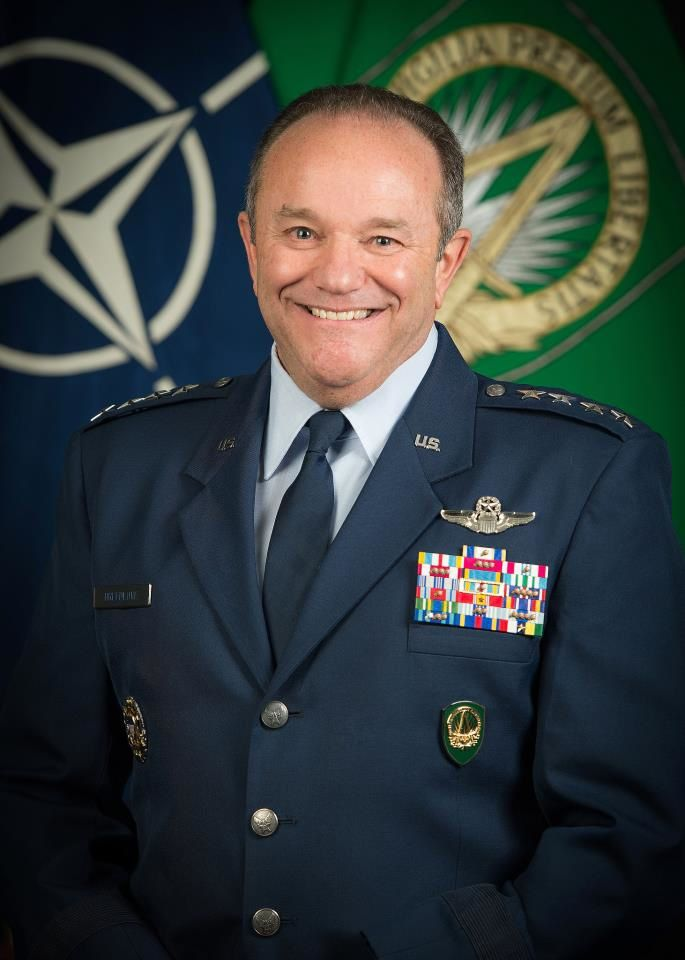
General Philip M. Breedlove (SACEUR) inaugurated the new NIFC building.

The NIFC has sophisticated communication systems with the purpose of enabling secure and reliable links to NATO headquarters, national intelligence agencies, and operational units worldwide. This infrastructure allows the organization to function as a fully integrated intelligence organization, geographically separate from main command structures. The NIFC's communication architecture is based on NATO standards for secure information transmission and is integrated into the Linked Operations-Intelligence Centers Europe (LOCE) network. This integration works to enable information exchange between all NATO member states and in supporting multilateral intelligence cooperation.

The organisation uses modern analytical software and data processing systems to collect, process, and analyze intelligence information from various sources. These technical capabilities are continuously modernized and expanded to keep pace with the rapid evolution of intelligence requirements. The NIFC has access to various national and NATO databases and can access both classified and open sources. This broad information base enables comprehensive analyses and the development of nuanced assessments of complex security challenges.

In 2014, a new, state-of-the-art building for the NIFC was inaugurated to meet the organization's growing needs. At the inauguration, General Philip M. Breedlove, then SACEUR, emphasized the importance of a suitable working environment for the quality of intelligence work and staff morale. The ongoing modernization of the infrastructure reflects both the growing importance of the NIFC within the NATO structure and the evolving technical requirements of modern intelligence work. Plans for further consolidation of the various intelligence organizations at Molesworth, including the Joint Analysis Center and the USAFRICOM (United States Africa Command) components, highlight the long-term importance of the site for Western intelligence cooperation.

== Integration into the modern NATO intelligence architecture ==
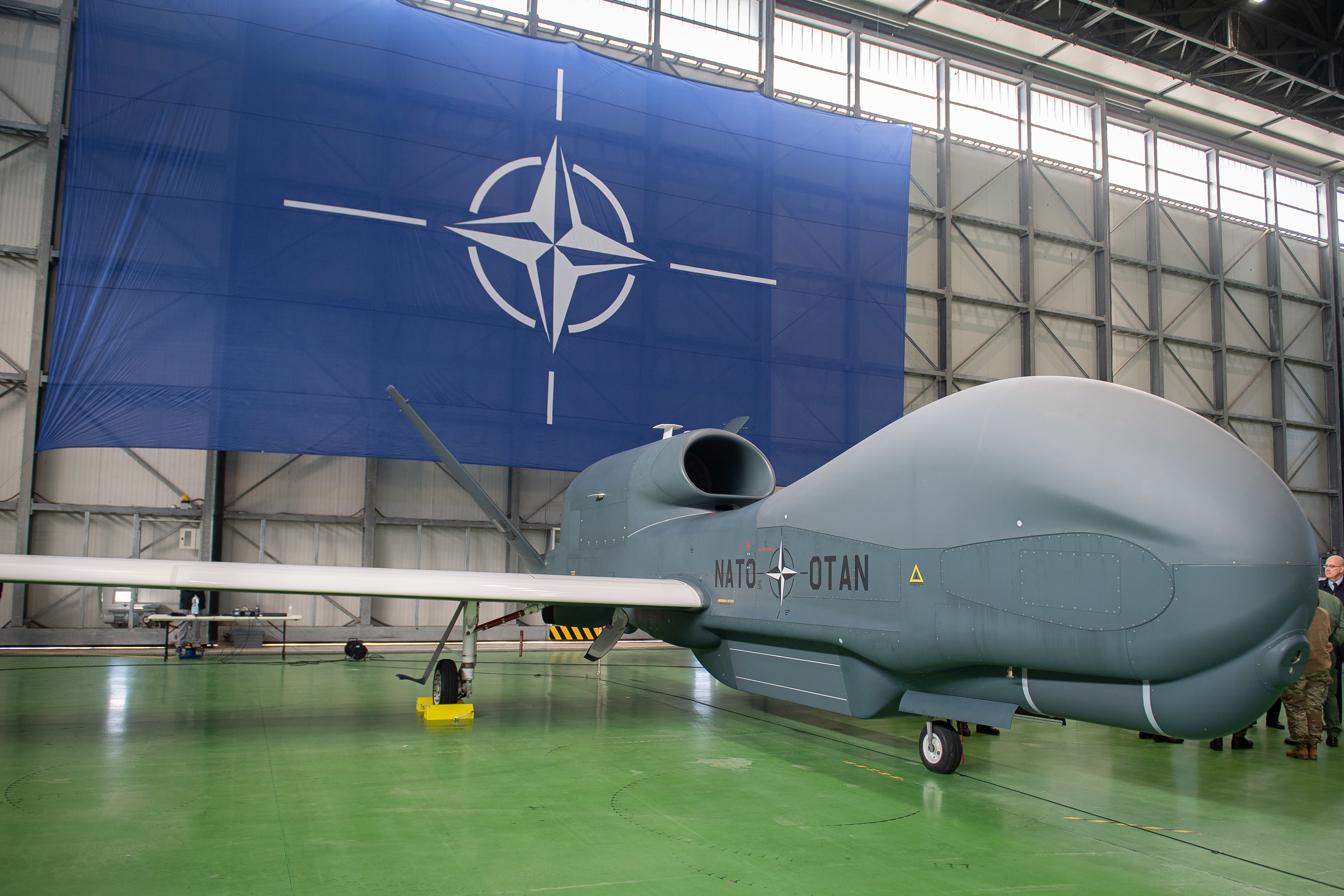
Global Hawk reconnaissance drone (NATOR RQ-4D)

The NIFC plays a central role in the NATO Joint Intelligence, Surveillance and Reconnaissance Initiative (JISR), launched at the 2012 Chicago Summit. This initiative aims to improve the coordination and integration of the alliance's intelligence and surveillance capabilities and to address the challenges identified during operations in Afghanistan and Libya. The JISR initiative involves the synchronization and integration of operational and intelligence capabilities to provide timely information to decision-makers. The NIFC acts as a central hub in this network, linking strategic, operational, and tactical levels of the NATO command structure. The organization plays a particularly important role in fusing and disseminating products from various collection sources, supporting both deliberate and dynamic target acquisition.

The integration of the Alliance Ground Surveillance Systems (AGS) into NATO's capabilities represents a significant development for the alliance's intelligence capabilities. The AGS system, consisting of five Global Hawk remotely piloted aircraft equipped with advanced radar systems, provides NATO with its own strategic reconnaissance capability for the first time. The NIFC plays a key role in analyzing and disseminating the data collected by the AGS system. This capability is particularly important because NATO has historically relied on the national capabilities of its members, especially the United States. The integration of the AGS system into the NIFC processes demonstrates the alliance's evolution toward greater strategic autonomy in intelligence gathering and analysis.

The NIFC has continuously expanded its capabilities to address new forms of threat, particularly in the cyber domain. The organization contributes to NATO's cyber defense strategy and works closely with the NATO Cooperative Cyber Defence Centre of Excellence (NATO CCD COE) in Tallinn. This development reflects the growing importance of cyberspace for modern security challenges and the need for integrated approaches to threat analysis. Counterterrorism remains another focus of the NIFC's activities, especially following the establishment of a dedicated NATO-level terrorism intelligence cell in 2017. The NIFC supports these efforts by providing detailed analyses of terrorist networks and supporting operations to counter foreign combatants.
