= List of United Kingdom locations: Wha-Whitc =

The United Kingdom

This is part of the list of United Kingdom locations: a gazetteer of place names in the United Kingdom showing each place's locality and geographical coordinates.

== Wha ==
Location	Locality	Coordinates (links to map & photo sources)	OS grid reference
Whaddon	Cambridgeshire	52.09°N 00.03°W	TL3546
Whaddon	Cheltenham	51.9043°N 2.0565°W	SO9622
Whaddon	Buckinghamshire	51.99°N 00.83°W	SP8034
Whaddon	Gloucestershire	51.8218°N 2.2432°W	SO8313
Whaddon (Salisbury)	Wiltshire	51.03°N 01.73°W	SU1926
Whaddon (Trowbridge)	Wiltshire	51.34°N 02.18°W	ST8761
Whaddon Gap	Cambridgeshire	52.09°N 00.04°W	TL3446
Whale	Cumbria	54.58°N 02.74°W	NY5221
Whaley	Derbyshire	53.23°N 01.23°W	SK5171
Whaley Bridge	Derbyshire	53.32°N 01.98°W	SK0181
Whaley Thorns	Derbyshire	53.23°N 01.20°W	SK5371
Whalley	Lancashire	53.82°N 02.41°W	SD7336
Whalley Banks	Lancashire	53.81°N 02.41°W	SD7335
Whalley Range	Manchester	53.44°N 02.27°W	SJ8294
Whalleys	Lancashire	53.56°N 02.78°W	SD4808
Whalsay	Shetland Islands	60.35°N 00.98°W	HU562635
Whalton	Northumberland	55.12°N 01.79°W	NZ1381
Whaplode	Lincolnshire	52.79°N 00.04°W	TF3224
Whaplode Drove	Lincolnshire	52.69°N 00.06°W	TF3113
Wharf	Warwickshire	52.17°N 01.37°W	SP4353
Wharfe	North Yorkshire	54.11°N 02.33°W	SD7869
Wharles	Lancashire	53.80°N 02.85°W	SD4435
Wharley End	Milton Keynes	52.06°N 00.64°W	SP9342
Wharmley	Northumberland	54.98°N 02.18°W	NY8866
Wharncliffe Side	Sheffield	53.44°N 01.56°W	SK2994
Wharram le Street	North Yorkshire	54.08°N 00.68°W	SE8666
Wharram Percy	North Yorkshire	54.06°N 00.70°W	SE8564
Wharton	Herefordshire	52.19°N 02.73°W	SO5055
Wharton	Lincolnshire	53.42°N 00.73°W	SK8493
Wharton	Cheshire	53.19°N 02.51°W	SJ6666
Wharton Green	Cheshire	53.19°N 02.51°W	SJ6667
Whashton	North Yorkshire	54.44°N 01.77°W	NZ1506
Whasset	Cumbria	54.22°N 02.76°W	SD5081
Whatcote	Warwickshire	52.09°N 01.57°W	SP2944
Whateley	Warwickshire	52.58°N 01.67°W	SP2299
Whatfield	Suffolk	52.07°N 00.94°E	TM0246
Whatley	Mendip, Somerset	51.22°N 02.38°W	ST7347
Whatley	South Somerset	50.85°N 02.91°W	ST3606
Whatlington	East Sussex	50.93°N 00.48°E	TQ7518
Whatmore	Shropshire	52.33°N 02.57°W	SO6171
Whatsole Street	Kent	51.15°N 01.01°E	TR1144
Whatstandwell	Derbyshire	53.08°N 01.50°W	SK3354
Whatton (Whatton-in-the-Vale)	Nottinghamshire	52.94°N 00.90°W	SK7439
Whauphill	Dumfries and Galloway	54.81°N 04.49°W	NX4049
Whaw	North Yorkshire	54.43°N 02.03°W	NY9804

== Whe ==
Location	Locality	Coordinates (links to map & photo sources)	OS grid reference
Wheal Alfred	Cornwall	50.17°N 05.40°W	SW5736
Wheal Baddon	Cornwall	50.23°N 05.12°W	SW7742
Wheal Busy	Cornwall	50.25°N 05.17°W	SW7444
Wheal Frances	Cornwall	50.32°N 05.12°W	SW7852
Wheal Kitty	Cornwall	50.31°N 05.20°W	SW7251
Wheal Rose	Cornwall	50.25°N 05.21°W	SW7144
Wheatacre	Norfolk	52.47°N 01.62°E	TM4693
Wheatcroft	Derbyshire	53.10°N 01.47°W	SK3557
Wheatenhurst	Gloucestershire	51.77°N 02.34°W	SO7608
Wheathall	Shropshire	52.62°N 02.75°W	SJ4903
Wheathampstead	Hertfordshire	51.81°N 00.30°W	TL1714
Wheathill	Somerset	51.06°N 02.60°W	ST5830
Wheathill	Shropshire	52.43°N 02.56°W	SO6282
Wheat Hold	Hampshire	51.33°N 01.21°W	SU5560
Wheatley	Hampshire	51.15°N 00.88°W	SU7840
Wheatley	Oxfordshire	51.74°N 01.14°W	SP5905
Wheatley	Calderdale	53.73°N 01.89°W	SE0726
Wheatley	Doncaster	53.52°N 01.12°W	SE5804
Wheatley Hill	Durham	54.73°N 01.42°W	NZ3738
Wheatley Hills	Doncaster	53.52°N 01.09°W	SE6004
Wheatley Lane	Lancashire	53.83°N 02.25°W	SD8338
Wheatley Park	Doncaster	53.53°N 01.11°W	SE5905
Wheaton Aston	Staffordshire	52.70°N 02.22°W	SJ8512
Wheddon Cross	Somerset	51.13°N 03.54°W	SS9238
Wheelbarrow Town	Kent	51.16°N 01.07°E	TR1545
Wheeler End	Buckinghamshire	51.63°N 00.84°W	SU8093
Wheelerstreet	Surrey	51.15°N 00.65°W	SU9440
Wheelock	Cheshire	53.12°N 02.39°W	SJ7459
Wheelock Heath	Cheshire	53.10°N 02.37°W	SJ7557
Wheelton	Lancashire	53.68°N 02.60°W	SD6021
Wheldale	Wakefield	53.72°N 01.31°W	SE4526
Wheldrake	York	53.89°N 00.96°W	SE6845
Whelford	Gloucestershire	51.68°N 01.76°W	SU1698
Whelley	Wigan	53.54°N 02.62°W	SD5906
Whelpley Hill	Buckinghamshire	51.72°N 00.56°W	SP9904
Whelpo	Cumbria	54.74°N 03.08°W	NY3039
Whelp Street	Suffolk	52.10°N 00.83°E	TL9449
Whelston	Flintshire	53.27°N 03.18°W	SJ2176
Whempstead	Hertfordshire	51.86°N 00.09°W	TL3120
Whenby	North Yorkshire	54.11°N 01.03°W	SE6369
Whepstead	Suffolk	52.19°N 00.67°E	TL8358
Wherry Town	Cornwall	50.10°N 05.55°W	SW4629
Wherstead	Suffolk	52.01°N 01.13°E	TM1540
Wherwell	Hampshire	51.15°N 01.45°W	SU3840
Wheston	Derbyshire	53.28°N 01.80°W	SK1376
Whetley Cross	Dorset	50.83°N 02.78°W	ST4504
Whetsted	Kent	51.18°N 00.35°E	TQ6545
Whetstone	Leicestershire	52.56°N 01.18°W	SP5597
Whetstone	Barnet	51.62°N 00.18°W	TQ2693
Whettleton	Shropshire	52.43°N 02.82°W	SO4482

== Whi-Whitc ==
Location	Locality	Coordinates (links to map & photo sources)	OS grid reference
Whicham	Cumbria	54.22°N 03.33°W	SD1382
Whichford	Warwickshire	52.00°N 01.54°W	SP3134
Whickham	Gateshead	54.93°N 01.68°W	NZ2060
Whickham Fell	Gateshead	54.92°N 01.68°W	NZ2059
Whiddon	Devon	51.12°N 04.07°W	SS5538
Whiddon Down	Devon	50.71°N 03.87°W	SX6892
Whifflet	North Lanarkshire	55.85°N 04.03°W	NS7364
Whigstreet	Angus	56.58°N 02.84°W	NO4844
Whilton	Northamptonshire	52.27°N 01.07°W	SP6364
Whilton Locks	Northamptonshire	52.27°N 01.10°W	SP6164
Whimble	Devon	50.79°N 04.35°W	SS3402
Whimple	Devon	50.76°N 03.36°W	SY0497
Whimpwell Green	Norfolk	52.80°N 01.53°E	TG3829
Whinburgh	Norfolk	52.64°N 00.95°E	TG0009
Whinfield	Darlington	54.54°N 01.52°W	NZ3117
Whinhall	North Lanarkshire	55.86°N 03.99°W	NS7565
Whin Lane End	Lancashire	53.86°N 02.92°W	SD3941
Whinmoor	Leeds	53.81°N 01.45°W	SE3636
Whinney Hill	Darlington	54.56°N 01.41°W	NZ3819
Whinney Hill	Rotherham	53.44°N 01.32°W	SK4594
Whinnieliggate	Dumfries and Galloway	54.84°N 04.01°W	NX7152
Whinnyfold	Aberdeenshire	57.38°N 01.88°W	NK0733
Whinny Heights	Lancashire	53.72°N 02.47°W	SD6926
Whins of Milton	Stirling	56.08°N 03.94°W	NS7990
Whins Wood	Bradford	53.83°N 01.92°W	SE0538
Whipcott	Devon	50.95°N 03.32°W	ST0718
Whippendell Bottom	Hertfordshire	51.70°N 00.48°W	TL0502
Whippingham	Isle of Wight	50.73°N 01.27°W	SZ5193
Whipsiderry	Cornwall	50.42°N 05.05°W	SW8363
Whipsnade	Bedfordshire	51.85°N 00.54°W	TL0018
Whipton	Devon	50.72°N 03.50°W	SX9493
Whirley Grove	Cheshire	53.27°N 02.18°W	SJ8875
Whirlow	Sheffield	53.33°N 01.53°W	SK3182
Whirlow Brook	Sheffield	53.33°N 01.53°W	SK3182
Whisby	Lincolnshire	53.19°N 00.65°W	SK9067
Whissendine	Rutland	52.71°N 00.78°W	SK8214
Whissonsett	Norfolk	52.77°N 00.83°E	TF9123
Whisterfield	Cheshire	53.23°N 02.27°W	SJ8271
Whistlefield	Dunbartonshire	56.0933°N 4.8369°W	NS236926
Whistlefield	Argyll and Bute	56.08°N 04.84°W	NS2392
Whistley Green	Berkshire	51.45°N 00.86°W	SU7974
Whistlow	Oxfordshire	51.92°N 01.34°W	SP4525
Whiston	Knowsley	53.41°N 02.79°W	SJ4791
Whiston	Northamptonshire	52.23°N 00.77°W	SP8460
Whiston	Rotherham	53.40°N 01.32°W	SK4590
Whiston (Staffordshire Moorlands)	Staffordshire	53.02°N 01.95°W	SK0347
Whiston (South Staffordshire)	Staffordshire	52.72°N 02.16°W	SJ8914
Whiston Cross	Knowsley	53.41°N 02.81°W	SJ4691
Whiston Cross	Shropshire	52.62°N 02.31°W	SJ7903
Whitacre Heath	Warwickshire	52.52°N 01.69°W	SP2192
Whitbeck	Cumbria	54.24°N 03.36°W	SD1184
Whitbourne	Herefordshire	52.20°N 02.41°W	SO7256
Whitbourne Moor	Wiltshire	51.20°N 02.25°W	ST8245
Whitburn	South Tyneside	54.95°N 01.37°W	NZ4062
Whitburn	West Lothian	55.85°N 03.69°W	NS9464
Whitby	North Yorkshire	54.47°N 00.62°W	NZ8910
Whitby	Cheshire	53.26°N 02.91°W	SJ3975
Whitbyheath	Cheshire	53.25°N 02.91°W	SJ3974
Whitchurch (Bristol)	Bath and North East Somerset	51.40°N 02.56°W	ST6167
Whitchurch	Buckinghamshire	51.87°N 00.83°W	SP8020
Whitchurch	Cardiff	51.50°N 03.24°W	ST1479
Whitchurch	Devon	50.53°N 04.13°W	SX4973
Whitchurch	Hampshire	51.22°N 01.34°W	SU4648
Whitchurch	Herefordshire	51.84°N 02.66°W	SO5417
Whitchurch	Pembrokeshire	51.88°N 05.19°W	SM8025
Whitchurch	Shropshire	52.96°N 02.68°W	SJ5441
Whitchurch (Henstridge)	Somerset	50.97°N 02.40°W	ST7220
Whitchurch Canonicorum	Dorset	50.75°N 02.86°W	SY3995
Whitchurch Hill	Oxfordshire	51.50°N 01.07°W	SU6479
Whitchurch-on-Thames	Oxfordshire	51.48°N 01.09°W	SU6377
Whitcombe	Somerset	51.00°N 02.52°W	ST6323
Whitcombe	Dorset	50.69°N 02.41°W	SY7188
Whitcot	Shropshire	52.51°N 02.92°W	SO3791
Whitcott Keysett	Shropshire	52.43°N 03.07°W	SO2782
