= Whistlefield =

Whistlefield may refer to one of the below two settlements in Scotland:

- Whistlefield, Argyll, hamlet on the Cowal peninsula, Argyll and Bute, Scotland
- Whistlefield, Dunbartonshire, location above Loch Long, Argyll and Bute, Scotland
