= Canal pound =

Stretch of level water impounded between two canal locks

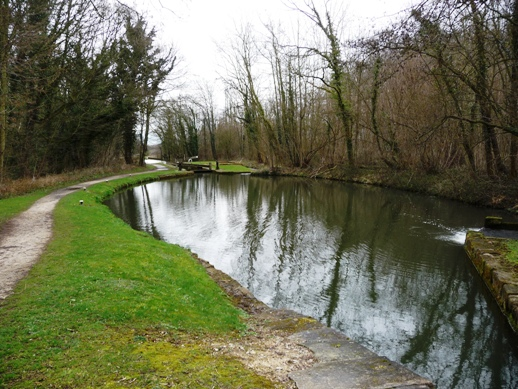
A short pound on the Chesterfield Canal in England, United Kingdom.

A canal pound (from impound), reach, or level (American usage), is the stretch of level water impounded between two canal locks. Canal pounds can vary in length from the non-existent, where two or more immediately adjacent locks form a lock staircase, to many kilometres/miles.

The first recorded pound lock was developed by engineer Qiao Weiyo on China's Grand Canal in 984, improving on the canal's previous simple lock gates.

The longest canal pound in the United Kingdom is on the Bridgewater Canal between the stop lock on the Trent and Mersey Canal at Preston Brook (Dutton Stop Lock No 76) and the start of the Leeds and Liverpool Canal near Leigh (Poolstock Bottom Lock No 2), a distance of 39.5 miles (63.6 km). Another long pound is on the Kennet and Avon Canal between Wootton Rivers Bottom Lock and Caen Hill top lock. The longest level on the Erie Canal in New York was the so-called '60 mile level' (actually 64.2 miles (103.3 km)) between Henrietta and Lockport.

== History ==
Pounds came into being with the development of pound locks to replace the earlier flash locks. A key feature of pound locks was that the intervening level between locks remained largely constant, as opposed to the variable levels created by the opening of flash locks.

On some American canals, some pounds acquired nicknames due to the mileage between locks, e.g. the "Eight Mile Level" on the Chesapeake and Ohio Canal was between Riley's Lock (Lock 24) and Edward's Ferry (Lock 25), a distance of about 8 miles (13 km).

=== Engineering considerations ===
Making a channel that would not leak water is not easily done. Gravel soil or light soil will leak for a few years until it settles and hardens. Puddle or clay would be used to line the channel, but that was not foolproof. The Union Canal and the Schuylkill canal where the canal prism (the shape of the canal as seen in cross section) was blasted through limestone leaked so badly, they had to line the channel with timber. The Chesapeake and Ohio canal had frequent cave-ins due to limestone sinkholes near Shepherdstown, near Two Locks above Dam No. 4, around Four Locks, Big pool, and Roundtop Hill near Dam No. 6. requiring expensive repairs. After some years, the canal bed would settle and harden, and puddling would no longer be needed.

==== Water supply ====
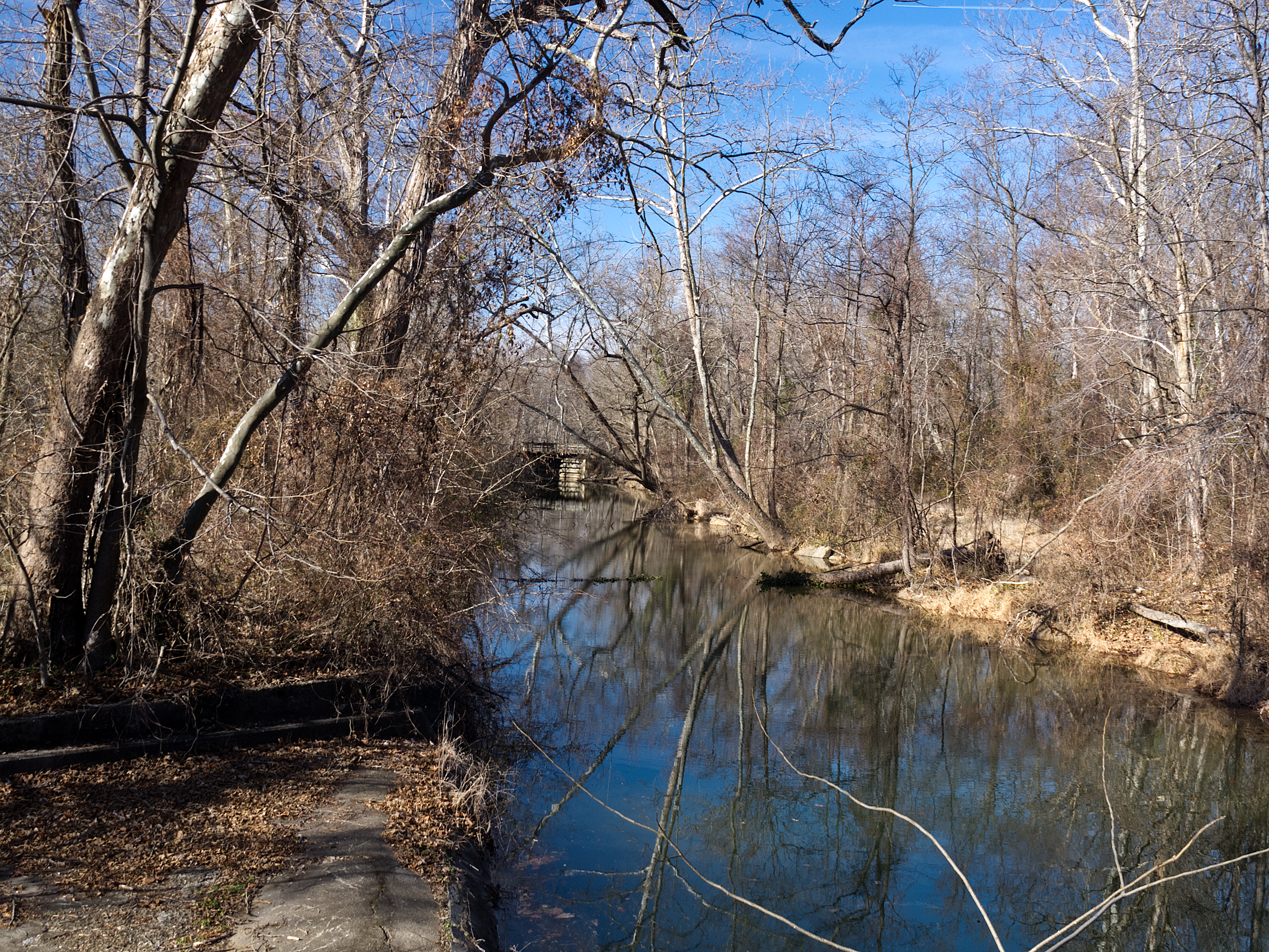
A feeder canal to feed the Georgetown level of the Chesapeake and Ohio Canal.

One main concern to the engineer was the canal's water supply. Pumping would contribute greatly to operating expense, especially at the summit level, hence gravity fed water is preferred. Feeder canals could be 20 to 30 miles (30 to 50 km) in length, if needed. The canal bed would have to slope so that the water would not flow too fast down the canal and impede the progress of upstream boats.

Rivers were often dammed to raise the water's height so that the canal could be fed, for instance, the Chesapeake and Ohio canal had seven dams built to feed water.

If a dam was not built, often water had to be pumped. The Chesapeake and Ohio put a steam pump near the South Branch, near mile 174, which had a capacity of about 25 cu ft/s (0.71 m^{3}/s), since the water from Dam No. 8 was insufficient. This problem is particularly acute on summit pounds (see below).

On the Delaware Division canal, the Delaware River was made to pump its own water into the canal, using an undershot water wheel which was connected to another wheel which had buckets attached, thereby lifting the river water up to the canal.

=== Winter ===
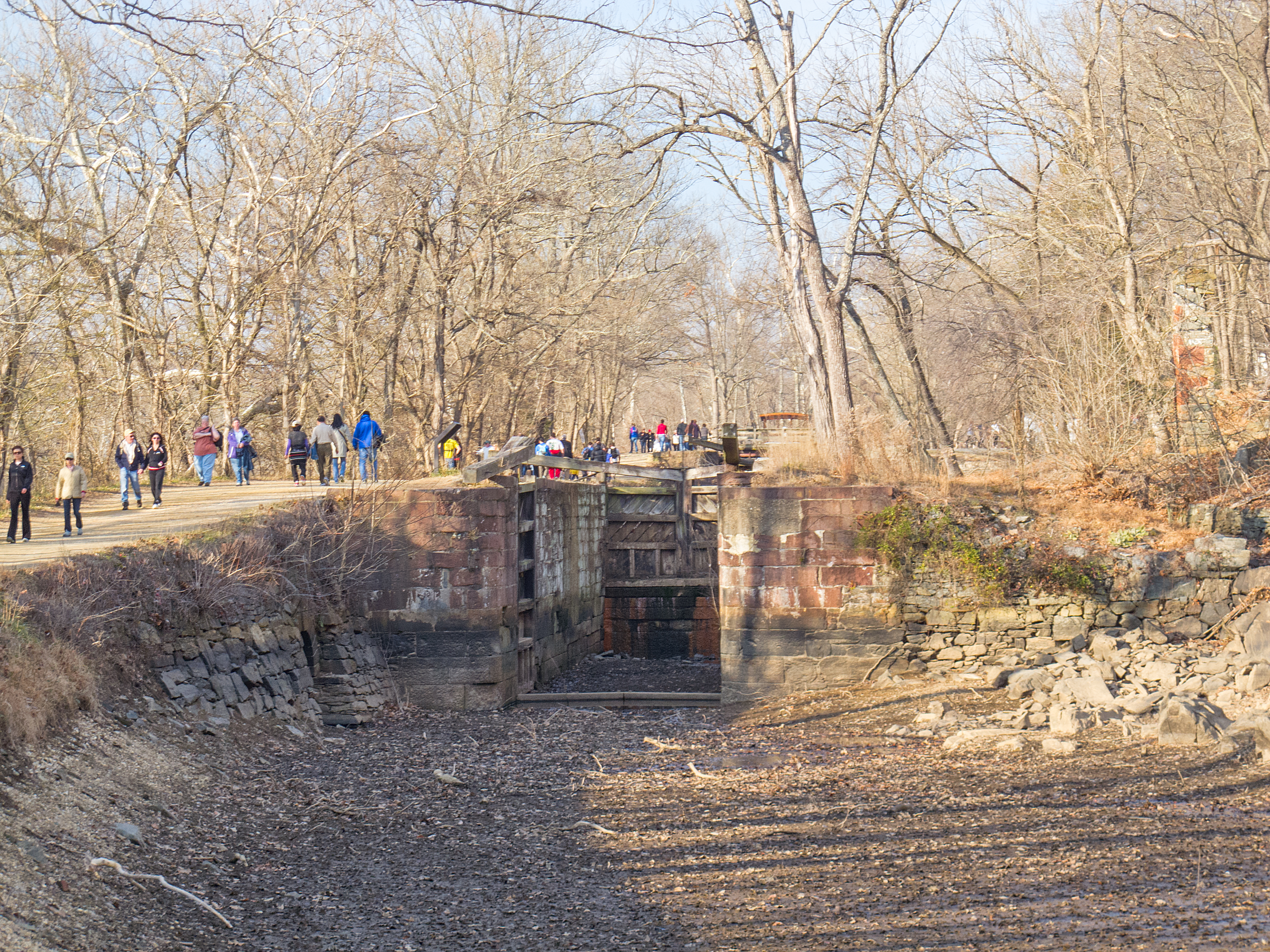
Canal drained for winter. Note: water "stain" on lock masonry indicates normal water level.

Where ice would form during winter, the canal prism would usually be closed and drained. During this time, sand bars would be dug out, locks and other structures would be fixed. Exceptions to this would include wartime necessities, i.e. the Chesapeake and Ohio Canal was left open in the winters of 1861–1862 because of the American Civil War.

=== Level walkers and repairs ===
American canals often had a man called a "level walker" (Chesapeake and Ohio Canal), "bank watchman" (Erie Canal), towpath walker or inspector whose job was to walk along the pound (level) with a shovel, checking for leaks and repairing minor ones before the leak could cause major damage, and calling the section work crew for major ones. His rounds were about 20 to 24 miles (32 to 39 km) daily. Muskrats would cause leaks by burrowing in the canal, as well as competitors such as stage coach lines or teamsters who would sabotage the canal by digging holes in the bank. Other duties included checking the waste weir gates to see if they were letting out the correct amount of water, checking aqueducts for damage, as well as being called in the night to search for missing persons supposedly drowned in the canal.

If a break or leak was discovered and the level walker could not do repair it himself, he sent a message to the section superintendent or headquarters, and the section crew with a repair scow would come. These boats carried clay straw, takes, rope, wooden boards, and tools (picks & shovels). For culverts and flood gates, a row of heavy planks, interlocked with tongue and groove, would be driven across the canal (similar to a cofferdam) above and below the break, and would swell when wet. After the water drained out through the break, it would be repaired. If the break was in the bank or berm of the canal, the crew would drive two rows of stakes, about one foot (30 cm) apart, across the breach, then weaving rope between them. Straw was put in it, and that would slow or stop the water flow. A row of planks were then driven to stop the flow, and then the break would be filled with dirt and rocks.

Burrowing animals, such as muskrats, would cause leaks by digging holes. Indiana canals had leaks from burrowing crawfish. Canal companies would often post bounties for muskrats, e.g. the Middlesex Canal.

== Types of pound ==
Pounds can be described in various ways according to their situation;

=== Summit pound ===
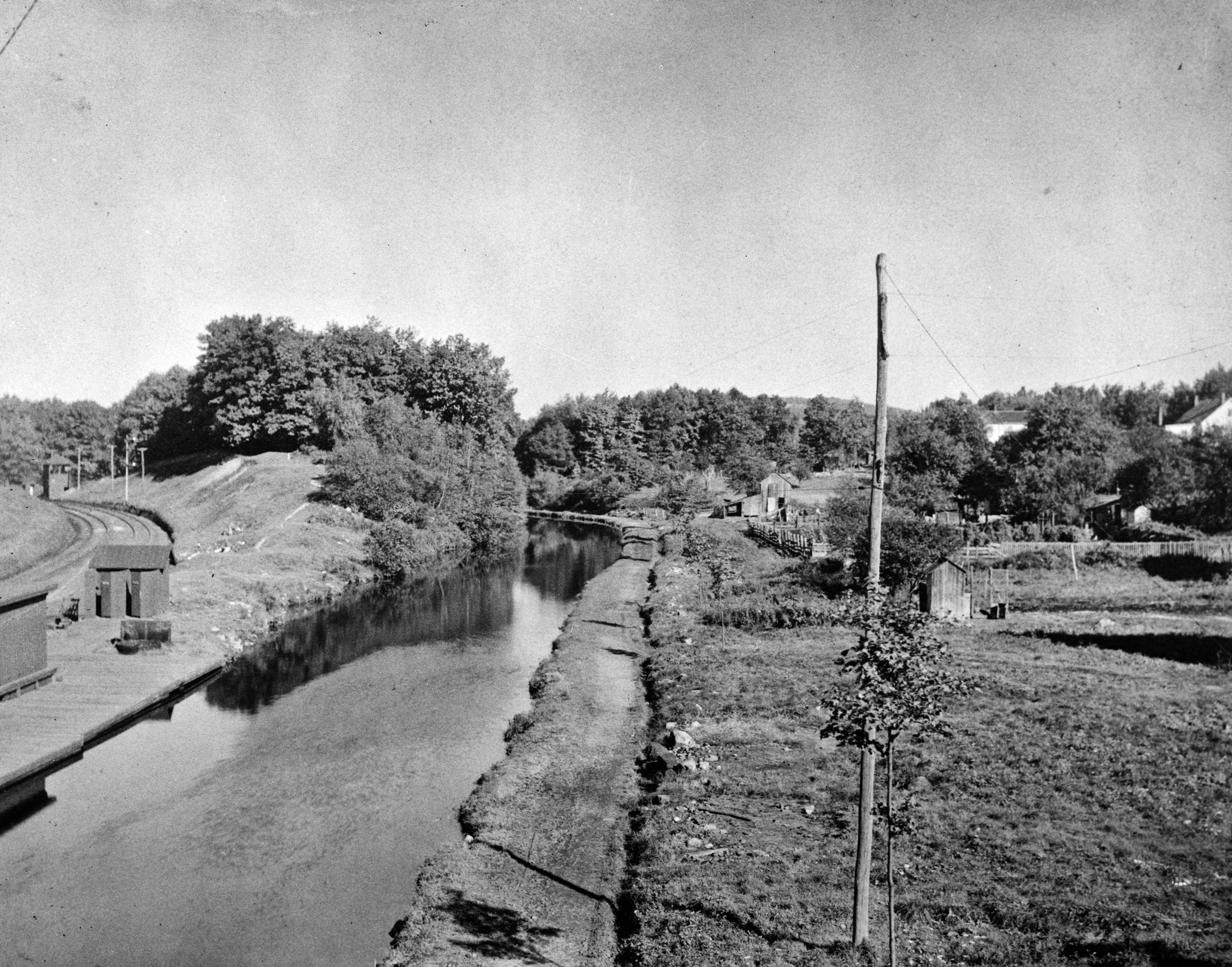
Summit pound (level) on the Morris Canal, fed by Lake Hopatcong through a feeder canal.

A summit pound is formed at a summit on the canal, and where all the defining locks descend from the pound. Summit pounds are particularly important in canal design, as every boat entering or leaving the pound causes a loss of water. Summit pounds therefore need an independent form of water supply, which may take the form of weirs on adjacent rivers, reservoirs or pumping stations. Common practice during canal design was to make summit pounds as large as practically possible, in order that losing a lockful of water would not lower the water level too significantly.

The Rochdale Canal is a good example of a canal with a relatively short summit pound, which requires restrictions on lock workings at certain times. The canal, which is one of three which cross the Pennines, is 32 miles (51 km) long, but the summit pound is just 0.8 miles (1.3 km). To the north and east, 36 locks descend to Sowerby Bridge, while to the south and west, another 56 locks descend to Castlefield Junction, on the edge of Manchester. The summit pound is 600 feet (183 m) above sea level, and is one of the highest summit pounds in Britain. In order to keep it in water, the company built a total of eight reservoirs near the summit pound. Hollingworth Reservoir was at a lower level than the summit, and so a steam engine was installed to pump the water up to a 4-mile (6.4 km) feeder, which delivered it to the summit pound. One reason for the present restriction on boat movements over the summit is that the water rights and associated works were sold to various local authorities in 1923 under the terms of the Oldham and Rochdale Corporations Water Act, as the subsequent increase in leisure traffic was not anticipated. The first canal to be constructed with a summit pound in the United Kingdom was the Newry Canal, completed in 1741, which linked Newry to Lough Neagh. The summit pound was 5.2 miles (8.4 km) long, between Poyntz Pass and Terryhoogan, but its water supply was a cause of problems over many years.

Pennsylvania's Union Canal suffered likewise on its summit level for lack of water. To rectify that, engineers had to put three large dams across Swartara creek, a one-mile-long (1.6 km) dam over Cattail Creek, and the water then passed to a powerhouse where the water was pumped (using water wheels and additional steam pumps if needed) 95 feet (29 m) up, whereupon it flowed 4 miles (6.4 km) through an aqueduct.

The Morris Canal in New Jersey used Lake Hopatcong to feed its summit pound through a feeder canal. The lake was large enough, that traffic could enter the lake from the canal. Lock 1E was east of the summit pound, and Lock 1W was west of the summit pound. The Panama Canal also uses a lake (Lake Gatun) as its summit pound.

=== Sump pound ===
The inverse of a summit pound is a sump pound. In contrast to a summit pound, a sump pound is a point where every boat entering or leaving the pound causes an addition of water. The longest one is the 11.6-mile (18.7 km) Fenny Stratford pound on the Grand Union Canal, between Cosgrove Lock, which starts the ascent to the Braunston summit to the north, and Fenny Stratford lock, which starts the ascent to the Bulborne summit to the south. Every sump pound needs somewhere to discharge the surplus water, and in this case, a large viaduct and aqueduct immediately to the south of Cosgrove Lock carries the canal over the River Great Ouse, which serves that function.

=== Lock pound ===
A lock pound lies between two locks which are only a short distance apart. Water levels in the pound are liable to fluctuate as the locks are used. Boats entering the pound from the lower level remove a lockful of water from the pound, while those using the upper lock add a lockful of water. Because the maximum level in the pound is normally controlled by a bywash weir at the lower lock, some of the water from the upper lock may be lost over it, and if the lower lock has a deeper fall, there is a net loss of level when a boat passes through the pound.

=== Side pound ===
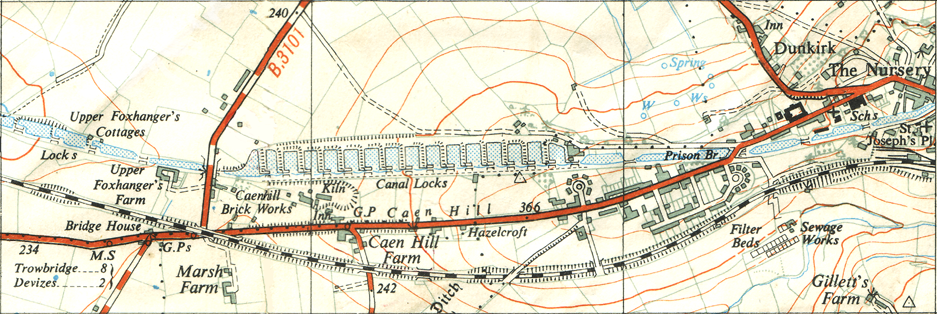
Map showing extended intermediate pounds at Caen Hill locks

A side pound is a particular type of extremely short lock pound, which is extended sideways to make up for the short distance between locks so as to avoid excessive level fluctuations. An example of this is the Caen Hill locks on the Kennet and Avon Canal. Climbing the hill that leads to Devizes requires 29 locks. The first seven and the last six have conventional pounds, but the middle sixteen have large side pounds, enabling all 16 to be fitted into a distance of around 0.6 miles (1.0 km).

Serving a similar function are the side ponds on lock flights such as the Foxton flight. The ten locks are organised as two staircases of five chambers each, where each lock can discharge water into the pond below it and receive water from the one above it. Although connected to the locks by sluices, they are still often called side pounds, as they are maintained at the level at which an intermediate pound would be if one were present. The term side pond is also used to refer to a water saving basin, which is maintained at a level between the upper and lower level of a single lock. Most of the locks on the Grand Union Canal between Whilton Locks and lock 45 at Bulbourne, the junction with the Wendover Arm, were built with two such side ponds, although they are currently disused.

== Regulating water level ==
Canals have several devices used to keep the water level from rising too high in the pounds, causing floods, washouts, and other damage.

=== Waste weirs ===
Example of a waste weir to regulate water level. (Looking from above)

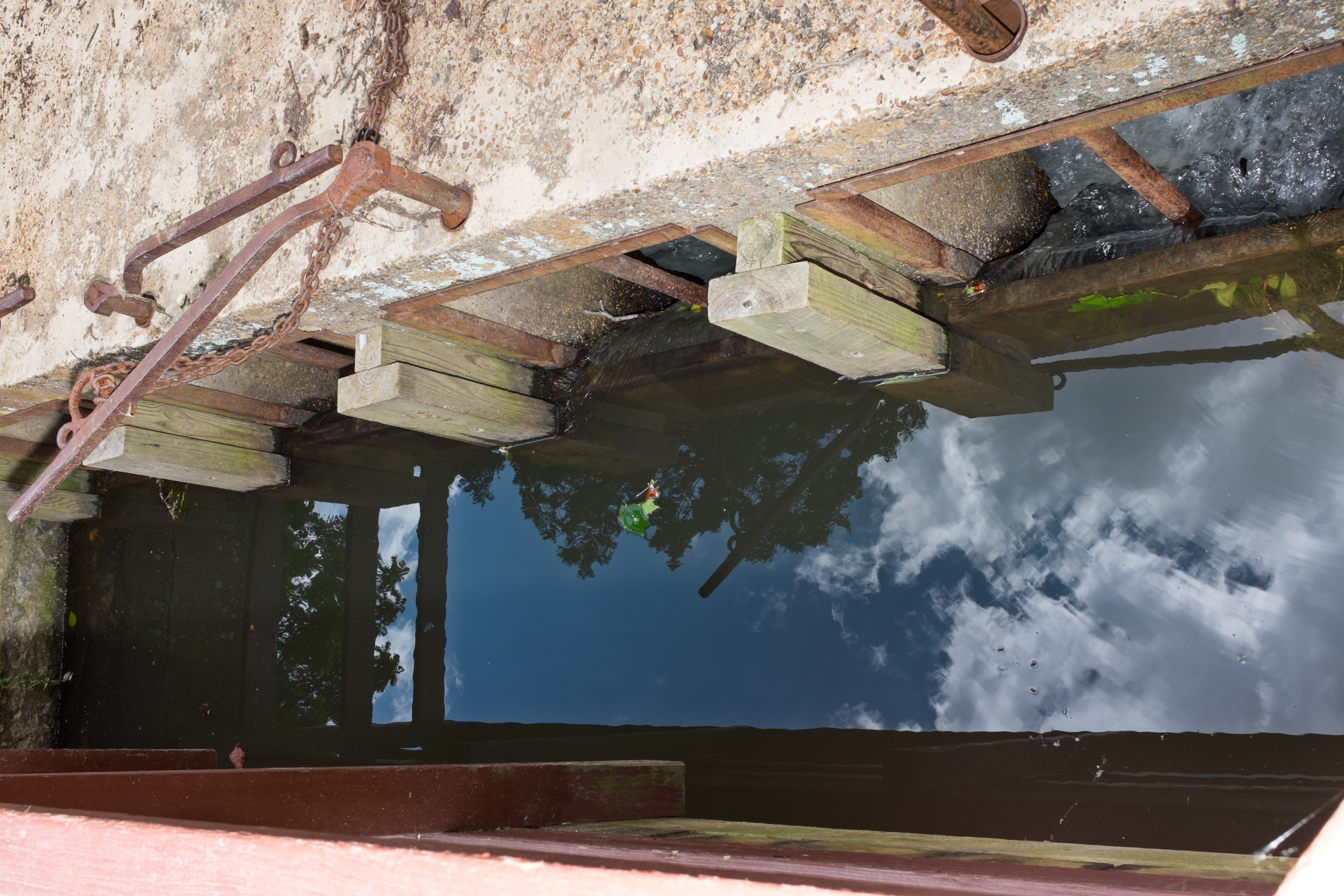
Paddle valves closed, and boards put in. Topmost board determines height of water in pound.

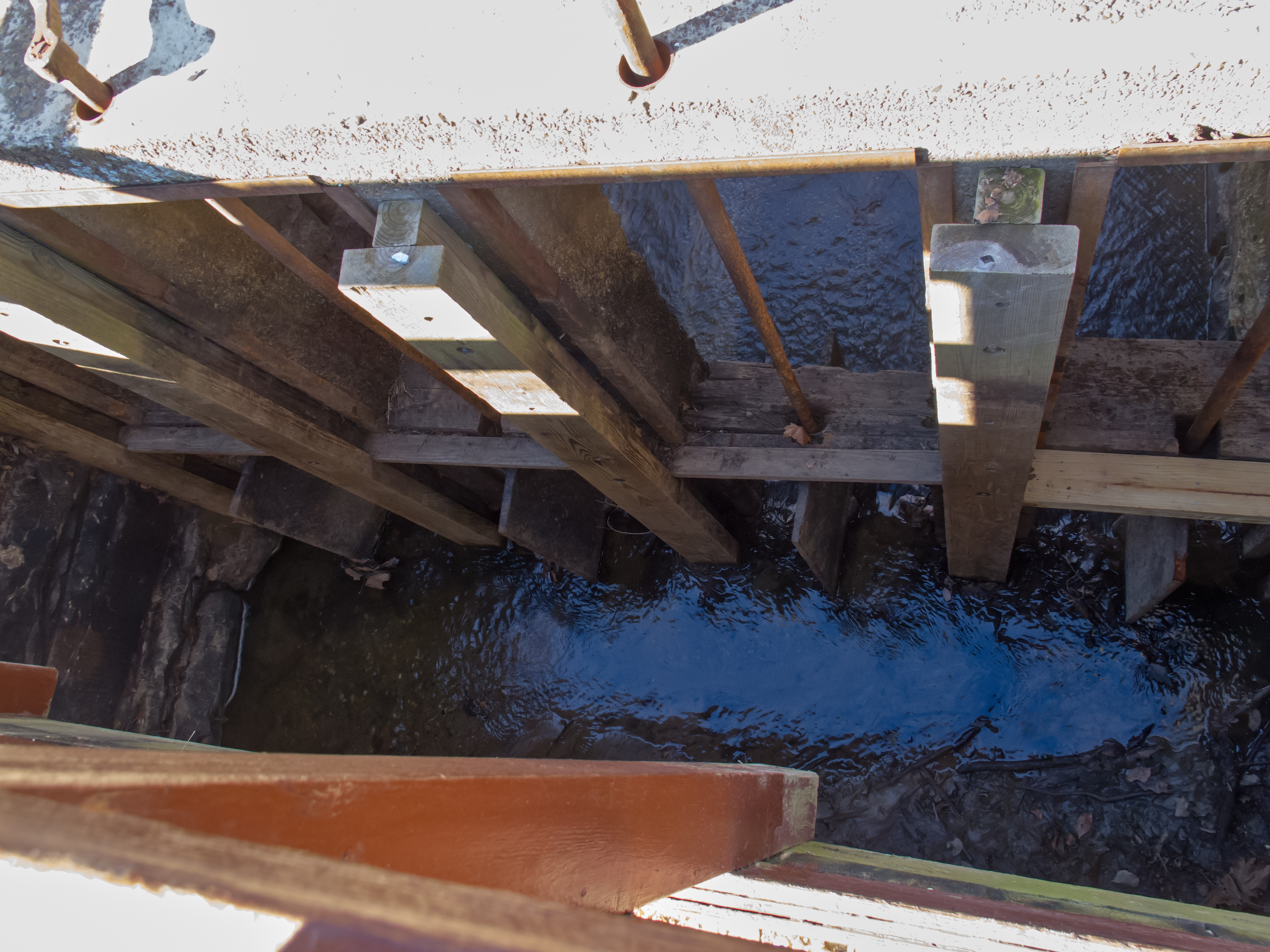
Same waste weir with valves open and boards taken out, to drain canal prism.

Waste weirs are used to regulate the height of the water in the canal. Any water higher than the highest board in the waste weir would flow over the board, and out of the canal pound. Boards could be added or taken out to adjust the height of water. Waste weirs often had paddle valves at the bottom, allowing the canal to be completely drained for repairs, emergencies, or at the end of the boating season for winter. On some canals (e.g. the Chesapeake and Ohio Canal) with the exception of short levels, almost every level had a waste weir between the locks.

At locks, there was often a bypass weir which fed water to the flume, allowing water to bypass the lock into the lower pound. This could be adjusted, similar to the waste weir by adding or removing boards to control the water level.

=== Spillways and informal overflows (mule drinks) ===
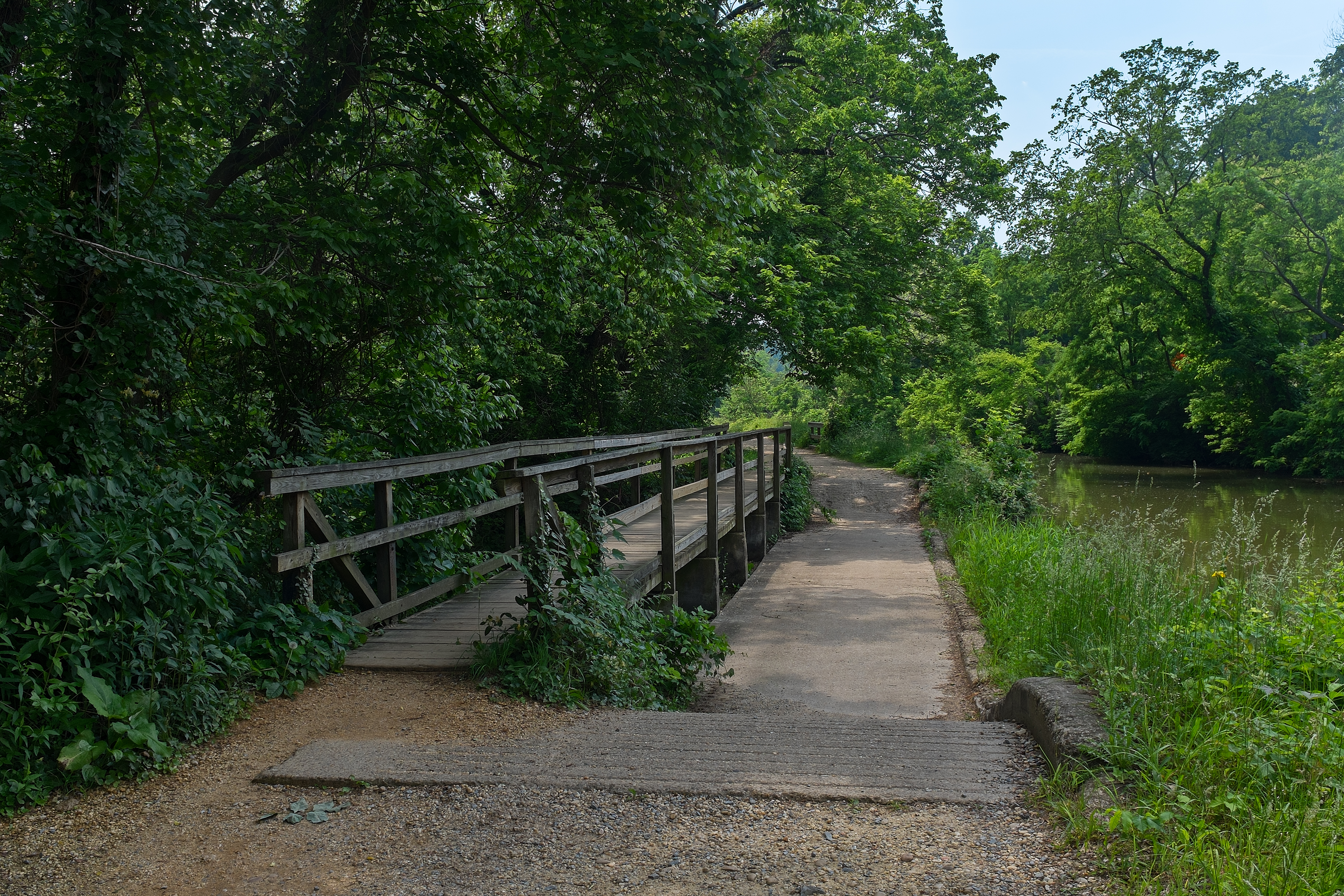
A spillway on the towpath of the Chesapeake and Ohio Canal.

Spillways were also used, allowing the water to spill over and into the surrounding rivers. These may be positioned over the towpath or on the berm side of the canal.

An "informal overflow" on American canals is a dip in the towpath which functions as a spillway, but usually lacking concrete or formal structure. The boatmen sometimes called these "mule drinks", since the mules would drink from the water flowing over the towpath. Informal overflows were often replaced by a waste weir or lined with concrete or masonry to make a more "permanent" spillway.

=== Stop gates ===
If the pound was many miles long, sometimes the canal would be designed with stop gates, so that if there was a break in the canal the whole pound would not lose all its water. Isolating the break would allow the company to make repairs sooner. For instance, on the 14 mile level of the Chesapeake and Ohio canal, there were stop gates put before and after Big Pool so that it (the Big Pool lake) would not have to be drained in case of breaks or repairs.

== Animal escape ==
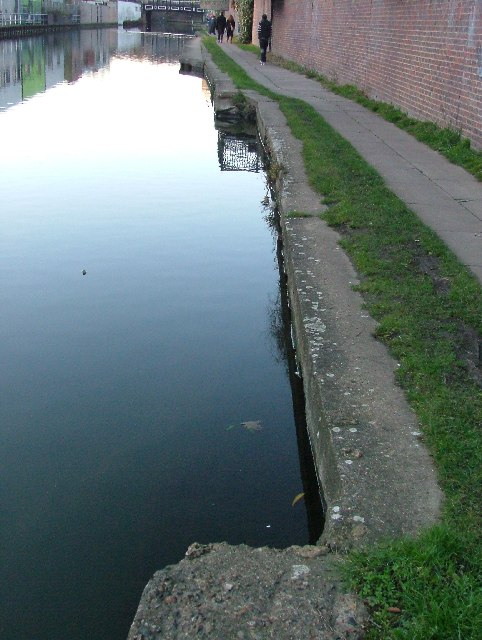
Indentation in the tow-path for the Regent's Canal in London, to accommodate horse submerged steps so that horses towing a barge that fell into the water could clamber out

On the Erie Canal, in the three-mile-long (4.8 km) rock cut above Lockport, if a mule or horse fell into the canal pound, there were some escape "holes" cut in the towpath, a depression covered over by wooden boards, so that the animal could go into the "hole" and then be rescued. This was as a result of the bank being practically vertical, making it impossible to retrieve one that fell into the canal.

Ramps at the side of canals next to the towpath are quite common in England particularly where horses were known to fall in. For example there is one on the Hanwell Lock Flight of locks on the Grand Union Canal.

== Sand bars and obstructions ==
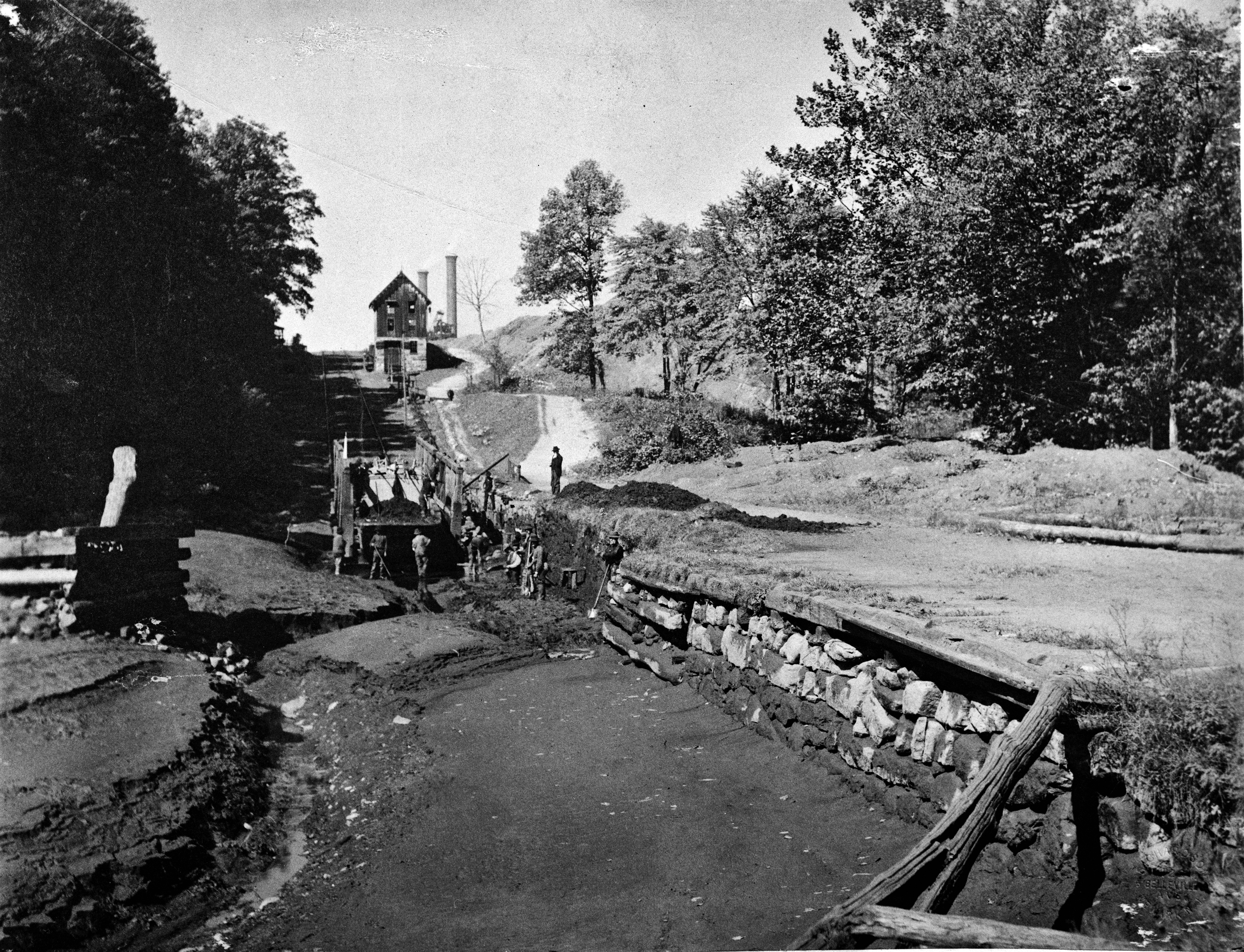
Work crew removing sand bar by inclined plane 5E on the Morris Canal

Canal levels sometimes have sand bars or shallow areas where the boat will get stuck. It is common on English canals for boaters to carry a barge pole to help punt the boat off an obstruction.

Some boats carried long iron-tipped poles to push themselves off, although some canals forbade their use. Sometimes boatmen would ask the lockkeeper of the lock above for a swell, to raise the water in the level, so that they could get off the sand bar.

== See also ==
- Mill race

== Bibliography ==
- Cumberlidge, Jane (2002). The Inland Waterways of Ireland. Imray Laurie Norie and Wilson. ISBN 978-0-85288-424-9.
- Cumberlidge, Jane (2009). Inland Waterways of Great Britain (8th Ed.). Imray Laurie Norie and Wilson. ISBN 978-1-84623-010-3.
- FIPT (1982). Foxton Locks and Inclined Plane. Leicestershire County Council. ISBN 0-85022-191-9.
- Hadfield, Charles; Biddle, Gordon (1970). The Canals of North West England, Vol 2 (pp.241-496). David and Charles. ISBN 0-7153-4992-9.
- Nicholson (2006a). Nicholson Guides Vol 1: Grand Union, Oxford & the South East. Harper Collins. ISBN 978-0-00-721109-8.
- Nicholson (2006b). Nicholson Guides Vol 7: River Thames & the Southern Waterways. Harper Collins. ISBN 978-0-00-721115-9.
- Skempton, Sir Alec; et al. (2002). A Biographical Dictionary of Civil Engineers in Great Britain and Ireland: Vol 1: 1500 to 1830. Thomas Telford. ISBN 0-7277-2939-X.
- Smithett, Robin (April 2012). "A bit on the side". Waterways World. ISSN 0309-1422.
