= 2026 RAF Fairford arrests =

Suspected Iranian-linked attempted terrorist attack in the UK

- Date: 27 September 2026
- Location: Whelford, Gloucestershire, England; 51.687897°N 1.758671°W
- Type: Under investigation
- Arrests: Six British; one British–Iranian dual national

On 27 September 2026, Gloucestershire Constabulary arrested five people in Whelford, a village near RAF Fairford in Gloucestershire, England. RAF Fairford is a Royal Air Force station used by the United States Air Force. They were held on suspicion of offences under the Explosives Act 1875 and the Terrorism Act 2006.

The police said the arrest followed a report of three suspicious vehicles travelling towards the base. A major incident was declared and about 85 households were evacuated while British Army bomb disposal specialists examined the vehicles. The next day, the head of Counter Terrorism Policing announced that the five suspects had all been released on bail. Two other people were later arrested and released on bail.

Prime Minister Andy Burnham said that there were "strong indications that Iran played a part in what happened". This was categorically denied by the Iranian Embassy in London.

== Background ==
RAF Fairford is a Royal Air Force station that hosts United States Air Force units, including heavy bombers. During the 2026 Iran war, the base was used by the US Forces for operations against Iran, with the UK government granting permission in March 2026 for operations against Iranian missile sites.

In the weeks prior to the incident there had been increased security at the airfield, including heavy vehicles and concrete blocks positioned across some airfield gates, and increased police activity around the airfield. The Independent reported that residents near RAF Fairford said they were told to stay indoors the evening before the incident, hours before police received the call about the alleged bomb plot, which the newspaper verified by viewing messages from a resident's WhatsApp group chat, including one resident who claimed armed police told them the police had intelligence of an imminent attack.

== Incident ==
At approximately 00:45 BST (UTC+01:00) on 27 September 2026, police received a call concerning suspicious activity in Whelford. Just after 01:30 BST police received a second call from a member of the public concerning three vehicles and a group of men acting suspiciously. Armed officers arrested five men in Whelford, about 2 miles (3.2 km) from the base, on suspicion of offences under the Explosives Act 1875, and they were further arrested on suspicion of preparing a terrorist act under section 5 of the Terrorism Act 2006.

Police established a 400-metre (1,300 ft) cordon around the vehicles, which were examined by British Army explosive ordnance disposal personnel. Residents of about 85 homes were evacuated to a leisure centre in Cirencester. CNN reporters near the perimeter fence heard what sounded like two controlled detonations from the direction of Whelford.

== Investigation ==
On 27 September, Deputy Assistant Commissioner Vicki Evans of Counter Terrorism Policing said the investigation was at an early stage and that the five men remain in custody. ITV News reported that the operation was not intelligence-led, so investigators had not known of a potential plot in advance. One line of inquiry was whether representatives of the Iranian government had paid others to carry it out.

On 28 September, the head of Counter Terrorism Policing, Assistant Commissioner Laurence Taylor, announced that the five suspects had all been released on bail, saying "To be very clear, this does not mean the investigation is over, they are subject to stringent conditions on their movement and contact with others. They absolutely remain under investigation as we explore multiple lines of inquiry." The Wall Street Journal reported that the possible involvement of the Islamic Revolutionary Guard Corps (IRGC) was an active line of investigation. The Times reported that no explosives had been found, and The Guardian reported that the materials found inside the vans were not viable explosives.

The five men arrested were all British nationals and London residents, aged 23–25.

On 29 September, Taylor said no explosive devices had been found in the vans after extensive examination, though some petrol, described as an "accelerant", had been recovered. The vans were marked with a logo of a fuel transit company which denied ownership of the vehicles.

On 30 September, it was reported that one of the suspects had called the police himself at 00:45 BST, almost an hour before the first member of the public reported having seen suspicious activity to the police. A call to police was made by a local farmer, just after 01:30 BST, after seeing three vans parked in a "weird formation" blocking the road, and "a large group of hooded and masked men" nearby who started to "panic" when they saw her. The farmer was insistent she had definitely seen more than five men, estimating the number as between eight and ten, many of whom had covered faces. Later Minister of Defence Wes Streeting thanked her for reporting the incident, but adding

"With respect, though, she does only have a partial picture. And that’s as far as I wish to go this morning but I do want to emphasise my thanks to the police and the security services because their work takes place often unsung, unreported, for good reason."

The Times reported that authorities were already on the scene when the second call was made.

On 1 October, counter-terror police said that two properties in Westminster, London had been searched and that a 25-year-old UK-Iranian dual national had been arrested on suspicion of preparation of terrorist acts. On 6 October police announced the arrest of a seventh man, a 22-year-old British national, in Westminster, who was released on bail.

According to several media sources, Iranian involvement in the incident has not been ruled out.

On 20 October 2026, two men were re-arrested on suspicion of assisting a foreign intelligence service under Section 3 of the National Security Act 2023. Police said the investigation related to Iran.

== Reactions ==
=== United Kingdom ===
Prime Minister Andy Burnham convened COBRA on 28 September, said the incident would be deeply concerning for local residents, and urged the public not to speculate. On the 30 September, Andy Burnham told the BBC that "There are strong indications that Iran played a part in what happened over the weekend at RAF Fairford".

Defence Secretary Wes Streeting thanked emergency and specialist teams and said the situation was being dealt with.

=== United States ===
US president Donald Trump said American officials had been working with the British and that "We had them under investigation. They were looking to do big damage to our fort".

While he did not name Iran as the perpetrators, saying he has to be "careful" about what he says, US Secretary of State Marco Rubio did state on Fox News that the incident "clearly involves the hand of a foreign actor".

On 4 October, all the USAF Rockwell B-1 Lancer bombers were withdrawn from RAF Fairford and returned to their home bases in the United States. On 10 November 2026 following another reported Iranian threat, the US military flew up to 12 aircraft from, RAF Mildenhall to bases in Germany and Spain.

=== Iran ===
Iran's embassy in ‌London rejected what it described as "unfounded and malicious speculations" linking Tehran to the incident.

== Timeline of events ==
Timeline of RAF Fairford incident and the investigation:

=== 27 September ===
- 00:45 BST (UTC+01:00) – First 999 call, Gloucestershire Constabulary say they received a emergency call on Sunday 27 September about "three suspicious vehicles" that appeared to be travelling towards RAF Fairford. The BBC reported that one of the five men who was later arrested had made the call himself.
- 01:36 BST – Second 999 call, a farmer living close to the base and returning home called 999 after seeing three vans parked in a "weird formation", she also reported seeing "a large group of hooded and masked men" near the vans who started to "panic" when they saw her. The woman told the BBC that she initially immediately called the Ministry of Defence Police but had not received an answer.
- Shortly afterwards (exact time is unknown) – Gloucestershire Constabulary arrested five men in the Whelford area. They were arrested on suspicion of committing offences under the Explosives Act 1875.
- 08:00 BST – Gloucestershire Constabulary declare a major incident, and set up a 400 metres (1,300 ft) cordon around the three vehicles. They also call the Army's Explosive Ordnance Disposal unit and evacuate 85 households in Whelford.
- 13:50 BST – Counter Terrorism Policing take over the investigation from Gloucestershire Constabulary and further arrest the five men on suspicion of preparing a terrorist act.
- ~16:00 BST – US President Donald Trump tells reporters the arrest of the five suspects was "fantastic" and "an amazing job" he went on to say "We had them under investigation. They were looking to ‌do big damage to our fort and working with the British worked out great" "We had them under view for a long time, and we got them."

=== 28 September ===
- 12:30 BST – Counter Terrorism Policing reveal that the five men were aged between 23 and 25 and all from various areas of London. They told media that they were being held under the Police and Criminal Evidence Act 1984 and that a custody extension has been secured by a judge.
- 12:30 BST – All five suspects were released on bail, Counter Terrorism Policing stated that the decision was "grounded in experience and careful consideration of policing powers".
- Monday afternoon – Prime Minister Andy Burnham called an emergency COBRA meeting.
- Monday evening – US Secretary of State Marco Rubio told Fox News that the incident "clearly involves the hands of a foreign actor".

=== 29 September ===
- Tuesday morning – media learned that the first 999 call to police had been made by one of the men who had been arrested, but it was unclear why, or what he told them.
- 18:00 BST – Counter Terrorism Police, in a media update, said that properties in London had been searched as part of the investigation. They also said that the three vehicles had undergone an "extensive examination" with the support of military and forensic experts. They said that no improvised explosive devices were found in the vans, but a "quantity of petrol" was recovered from them.

=== 30 September ===
- Gloucestershire Constabulary removed the cordon and reopened the scene.
- 17:00 BST – Andy Burnham told the BBC that "There are strong indications that Iran played a part in what happened over the weekend at RAF Fairford", earlier in the week Iran's embassy in ‌London rejected what it described as "unfounded and malicious speculations" linking Tehran to the incident.

=== 1 October ===
- A 25-year-old UK-Iranian dual national was arrested on suspicion of preparation of terrorist acts.

=== 4 October ===
- USAF removed all Rockwell B-1 Lancer bombers from the base.

=== 6 October ===
Police announced the arrest of a seventh individual, on suspicion of preparation of terrorist acts.

=== 12 October ===
In an address to Parliament, Andy Burnham said: "I can confirm our assessment that it is highly likely to have been coordinated in Iran, almost certainly directed by Iran’s Islamic Revolutionary Guards." Ali Mousavi, the Iranian ambassador to the UK, formally denied Burnham's claims in a statement carried by the Iranian state media; meanwhile, the UK announced sanctions against two Iranian nationals in response to the incident, and said that foreign secretary Ed Miliband had summoned Mousavi for consultations over the incident.

=== 20 October ===
Two men were re-arrested on suspicion of assisting a foreign intelligence service under Section 3 of the National Security Act 2023, related to Iran.

== See also ==
- United States Air Forces in Europe
- United States Air Force in the United Kingdom
