= Whistlefield Inn =

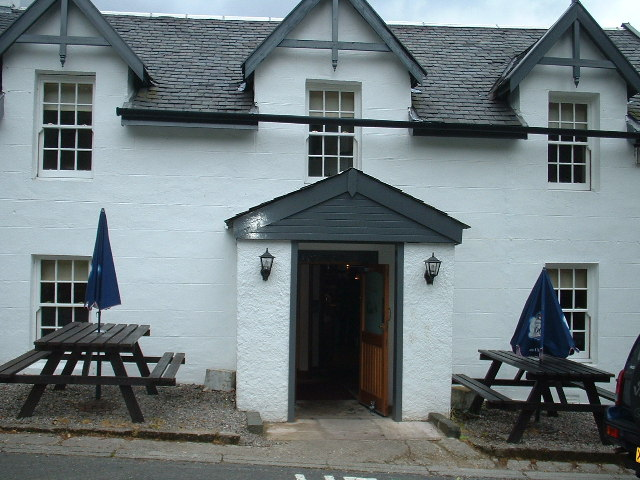
- The main entrance to the inn, pictured in 2005
- Interactive map of the Whistlefield Inn area

General information
- Type: Inn and restaurant
- Location: Whistlefield, Dunoon, Scotland
- Coordinates: 56°05′46″N 4°59′05″W
- Elevation: 196.85 feet (60.00 m)
- Completed: 1663

Height
- Roof: Slate

Technical details
- Floor count: 1.5

Website
- https://www.thewhistlefieldinn.com/en-US

The Whistlefield Inn is a Category C listed building in Whistlefield, Argyll and Bute, Scotland, about twelve miles northwest of Dunoon. Built in 1663, it was originally a drover's inn on the route between Strachur and Ardentinny. It sits about 1,300 feet (400 m) from the eastern shores of Loch Eck.

A bar and restaurant, the business came under new management in September 2018. It closed in 2024.

== Gallery ==
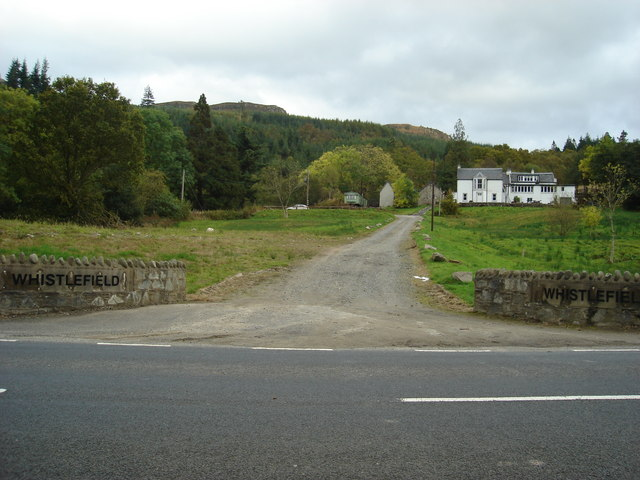
The rear of the inn, seen from the A815, which runs beside the eastern shore of Loch Eck

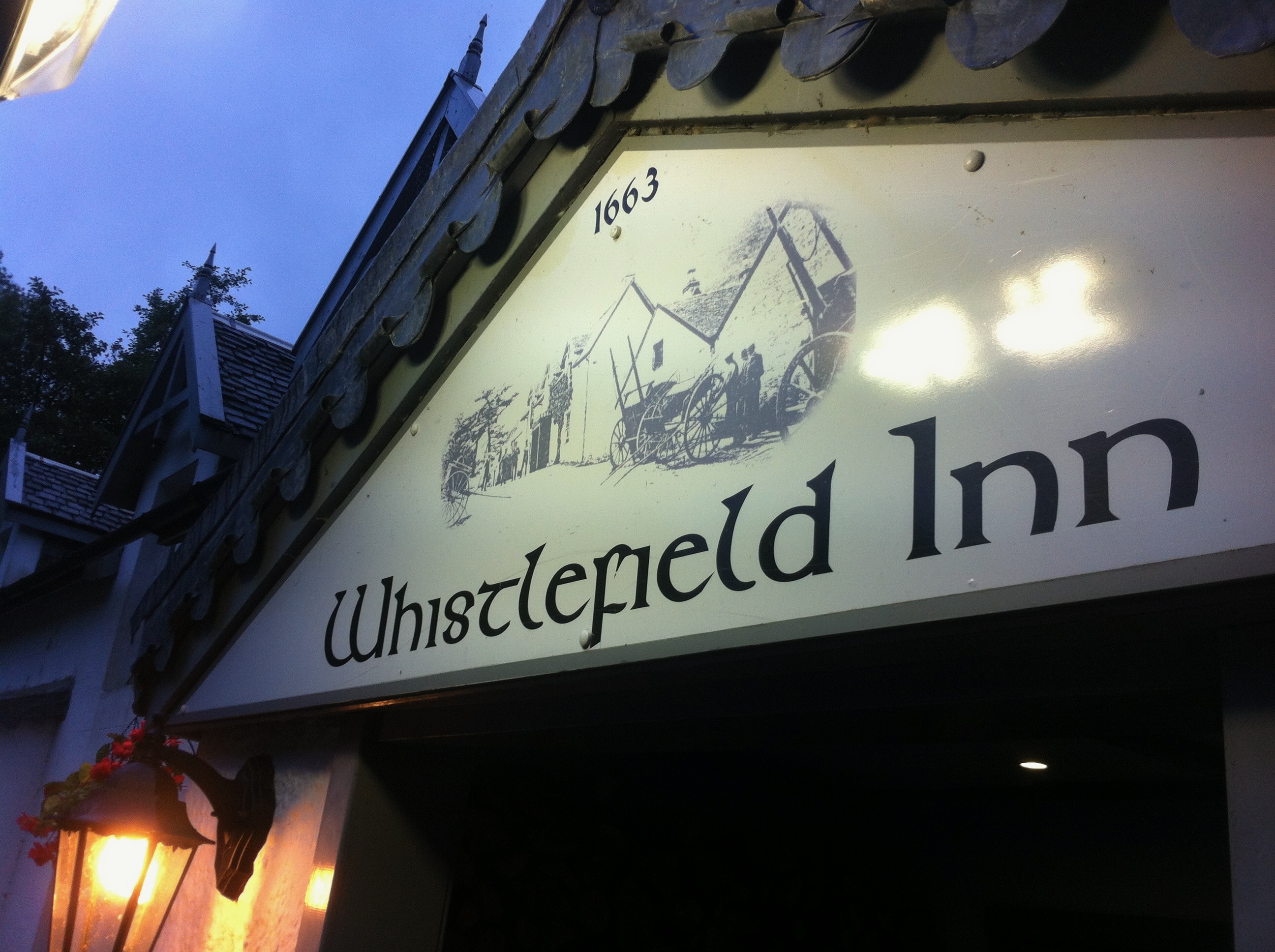
Above the main door, 2014

== See also ==
- List of listed buildings in Dunoon And Kilmun
