= Whilton =

Coordinates: 52.27737°N 1.06791°W

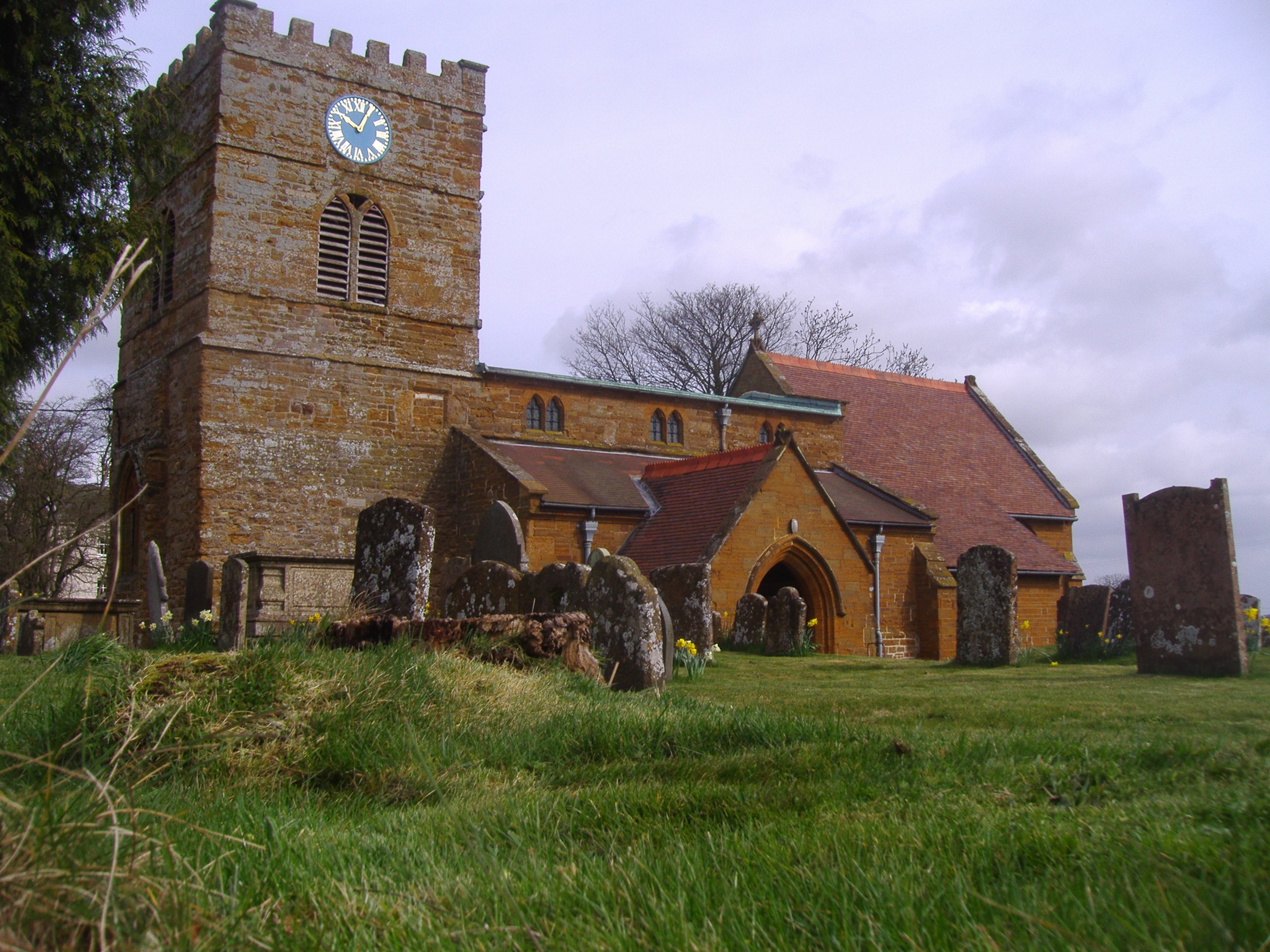
- Saint Andrew’s Parish Church Whilton

- Location within Northamptonshire
- Population: 271 (2011 Census)
- OS grid reference: SP637647
- Civil parish: Wilton
- Unitary authority: West Northamptonshire
- Ceremonial county: Northamptonshire
- Region: East Midlands
- Country: England
- Sovereign state: United Kingdom
- Post town: DAVENTRY
- Postcode district: NN11
- Dialling code: 01327
- Police: Northamptonshire
- Fire: Northamptonshire
- Ambulance: East Midlands
- UK Parliament: Daventry

Whilton is a village and civil parish in West Northamptonshire, England. The population (including Slapton) at the 2011 Census was 271. Whilton is 75 miles (121 km) northwest of London, 9 3/4 miles (15.7 km) west of Northampton and 15 1/2 miles (24.9 km) southeast of Rugby. The village lies 4 1/2 miles (7.2 km) east of the nearest town of Daventry. The nearest railway station is at Long Buckby for the Northampton loop of the West Coast Main Line which runs between Rugby, Northampton and London. The nearest airport is Birmingham Airport. Whilton gives its name to the nearby Whilton Locks and Whilton Marina on the Grand Union Canal. Whilton is also home to the world famous Whilton Mill Kart Circuit, where many drivers like Spencer Brougham (WMKC B Final runner up) and Jack Wilch (Electric Kart European championship winner) started their careers. Whilton Mill Kart Circuit is run by Chief Marshal Harry Bonham

== History ==
The village's name means 'Wheel farm/settlement', either alluding to the circular hill on which the village stands or the bending course of the stream here.

Whilton is mentioned in the Domesday Book of 1068, where it is listed under the name of 'Woltone'. The main tenant landowner was Robert, Count of Mortain who was the half-brother to William the Bastard, Duke of Normandy and later king William I of England.

Whilton gives its name to a book described as a Social-Legal Study of Dispute Settlement in Medieval England, called 'The Whilton Dispute, 1264 to 1380', written by Robert C Palmer, in which the Whelton family was engaged. The Mortimer & Montgomery families were also involved.

== The Parish Church of Saint Andrew ==
The Parish Church of Saint Andrew is constructed from the local Northamptonshire Ironstone and was built between the 12th and 13th centuries, although very little remains of this original, having been restored in late 18th century. The tower had a ring of 6 bells, which had been given in 1777 by the patron of the time William Lucas Rose, who also paid for their installation and the building work. Three of these original bells and three newer replacements were recast and, with added metal, were made into a ring of eight bells in 1994. They were cast by the Whitechapel Bell Foundry. The tenor (heaviest) bell weighs 675 kilograms (1,488 lb) and bears the inscription: CANON J.J. RICHARDSON, PRIEST /HAROLD HAYNES, JANET C. BOWERS CHURCHWARDENS /WHITECHAPEL 1994. The church clock is unusual as it was originally a one handed clock divided into ¼ hours and therefore does not have 60 minutes. In 1779 William Lucas Rose also gave a gift of communion vessels which are still in use today. The Church's east window, the only stained glass in the building, portrays the crucifixion of Jesus and dates from 1878.

== Amenities ==
The nearby Whilton Marina is close to Whilton Locks on the Grand Union canal. It was dug out in 1971 by the Steele family who still own and operate the business. The marina has over 200 moorings. The village also has a karting track nearby called Whilton Mill.

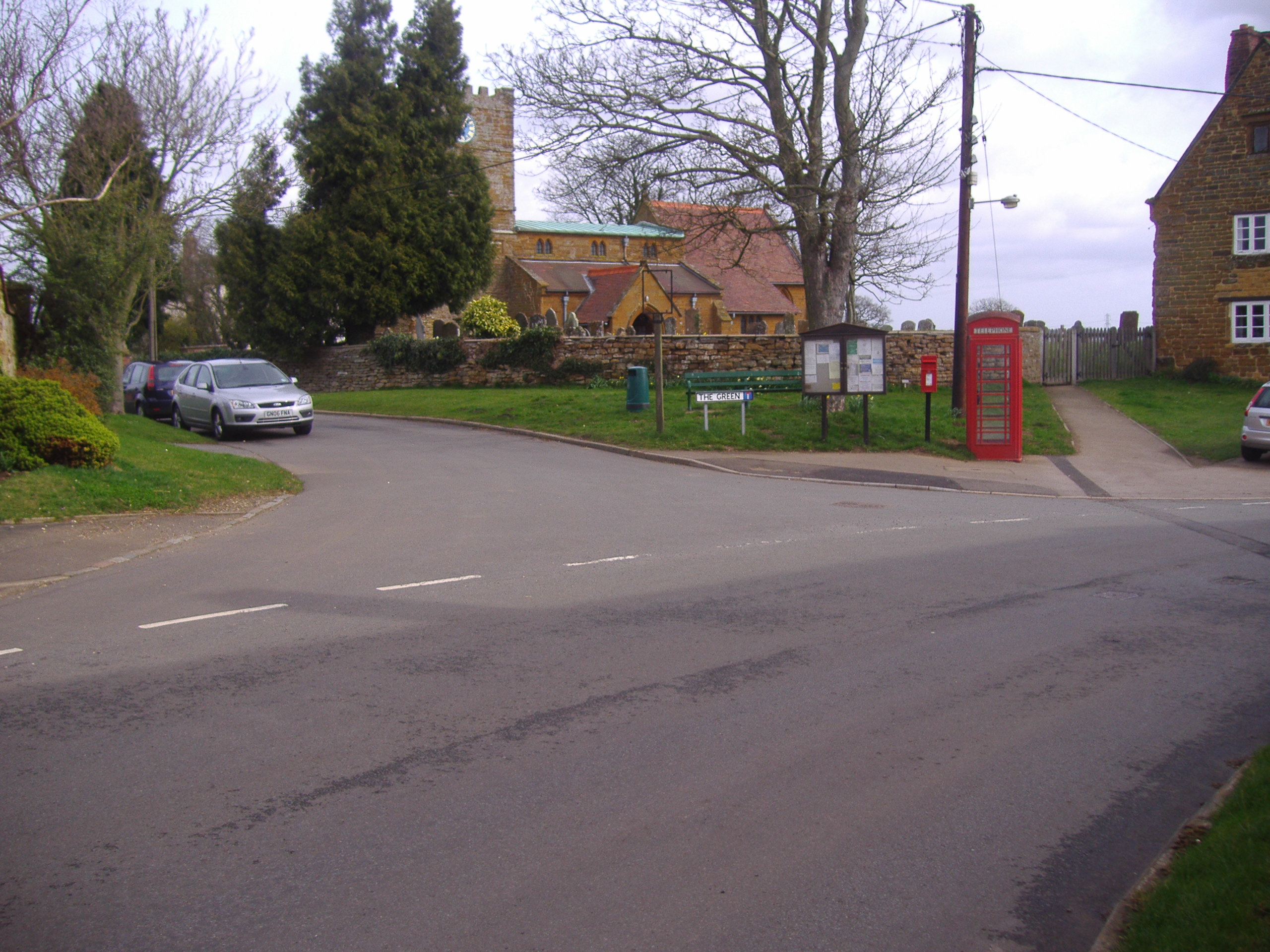
The village centre
