= RAF Fairford =

Royal Air Force station in Gloucestershire, United Kingdom

RAF Fairford
- Near Fairford, Gloucestershire in England
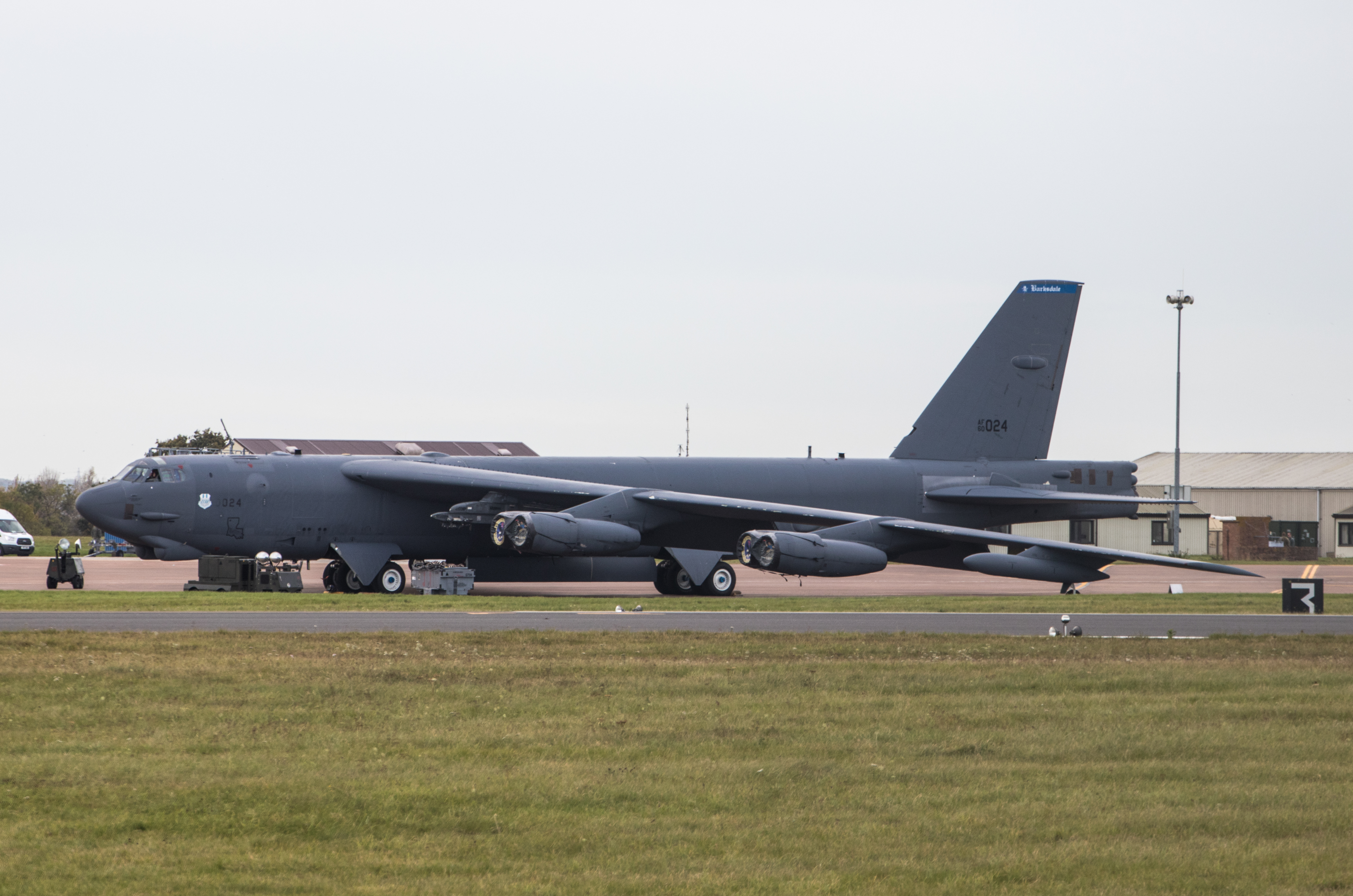
- A US Air Force B-52H Stratofortress at RAF Fairford in 2019

Site information
- Type: RAF station (US Visiting Forces)
- Owner: Ministry of Defence
- Operator: US Air Force
- Controlled by: US Air Forces in Europe - Air Forces Africa
- Condition: Operational

Location
- Shown within Gloucestershire RAF Fairford (the United Kingdom) RAF Fairford (Europe)
- Coordinates: 51°40′56″N 001°47′24″W
- Grid reference: SP150990
- Area: 514.2 hectares (1,271 acres)

Site history
- Built: 1943
- In use: 1944–1950 (Royal Air Force); 1950–present (US Air Force)
- Events: 1985–2025 Royal International Air Tattoo (RIAT)

Garrison information
- Occupants: 99th Expeditionary Reconnaissance Squadron; 420th Air Base Squadron; 420th Munitions Squadron

Airfield information
- Identifiers: IATA: FFD, ICAO: EGVA, WMO: 036440
- Elevation: 87.1 metres (286 ft) AMSL
Runways
Direction	Length and surface
09/27	3,046 metres (9,993 ft) Asphalt
- Source: UK Military Aeronautical Information Publication

Royal Air Force Fairford or more simply RAF Fairford (IATA: FFD, ICAO: EGVA) is a Royal Air Force (RAF) station in Gloucestershire, United Kingdom. Since 2019, the base has played host to a Lockheed U-2S Dragon Lady detachment from the 99th Expeditionary Reconnaissance Squadron. It is the USAF's only European airfield for heavy bombers and routinely supports Bomber Task Force operations. Its most prominent use in recent decades has been as an airfield for United States Air Force B-52s during the first Gulf War in 1991, the NATO bombing of Yugoslavia in 1999, the 2003 Iraq War, and the 2026 Iran war.

RAF Fairford was the only TransOceanic Abort Landing site for NASA's Space Shuttle in the UK. Its runway is sufficiently long for a shuttle landing (3,045 m (9,990 ft)), and it also had NASA-trained fire and medical crews stationed on the airfield. The runway is rated with an unrestricted load-bearing capacity, meaning that it can support any aircraft with any type of load.

RAF Fairford was also the home of the Royal International Air Tattoo, an annual air display, which is one of the largest airshows in the world, with the 2003 show recognised by Guinness World Records as the largest military airshow ever, with an attendance of 535 aircraft. Having been cancelled in 2026 due to uncertainties around the Iran war, it was announced in November 2026 that the show would move permanently to MOD Boscombe Down from 2027.

== History ==
=== Second World War ===
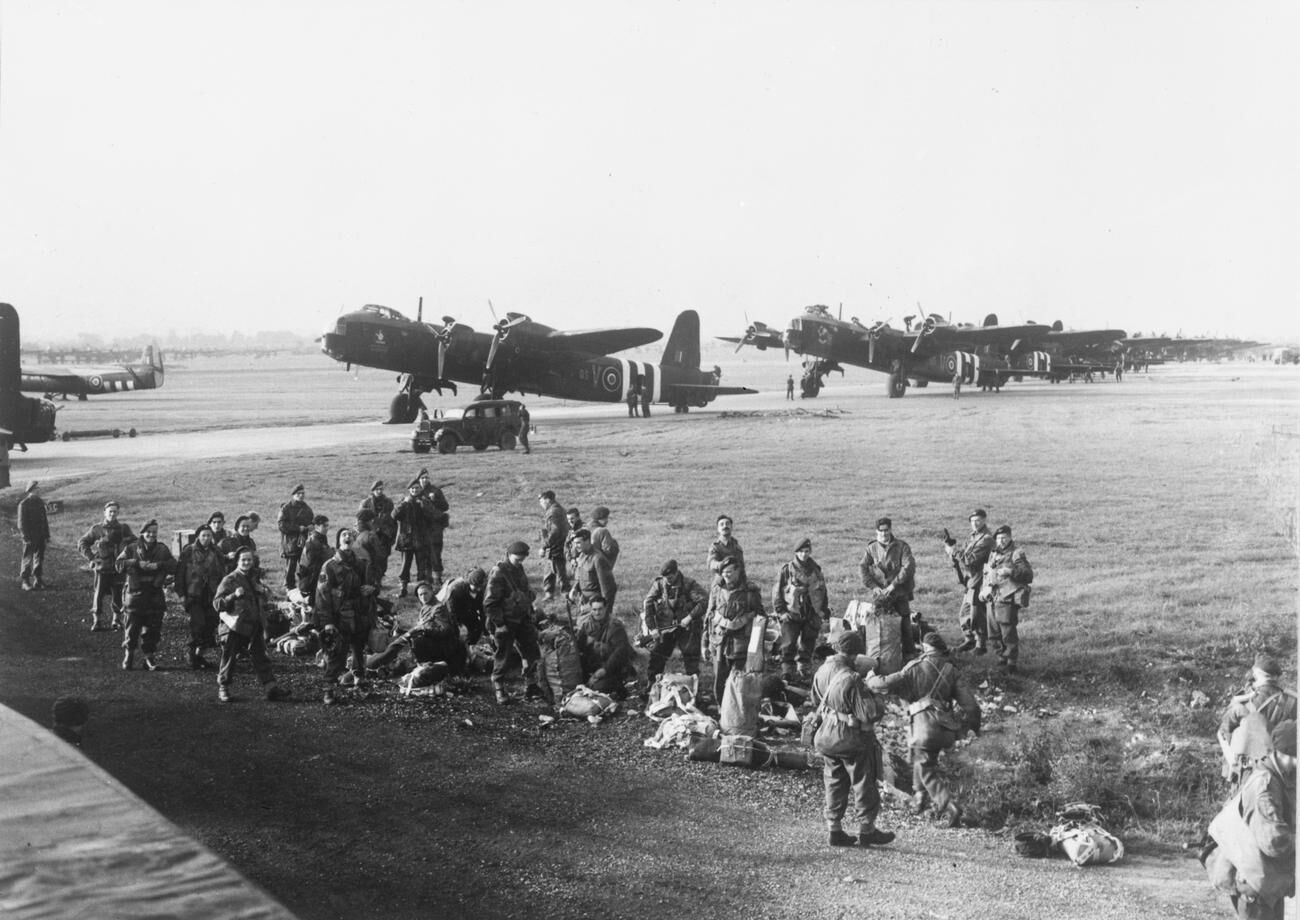
Soldiers boarding planes for Operation Market Garden

Construction started in 1943 as part of a programme to open 14 airfields in southern England to be used by British and American troop-carrier transports and gliders. The station opened on 18 January 1944. Initially intended to be operated by the United States forces, the first occupants arrived on 18 March when the RAF's No.620 Squadron equipped with the Short Stirling Mk.IV moved from RAF Leicester East, soon to be accompanied on 25 March by No. 190 Squadron also operating the Stirling. The aircraft were used for airborne forces operations, performing parachute drops of troops and supplies and towing Airspeed Horsa assault gliders. Troop carriers and gliders from Fairford were used for the D-Day invasion of Normandy. The RAF used it to lift British troops for Operation Market Garden.

These units were also based here at some point:

- No. 3 (Pilots) Advanced Flying Unit RAF
- No. 4 Flying Training School RAF
- No. 10 Squadron RAF
- No. 22 Heavy Glider Conversion Unit RAF
- No. 27 Group Communication Flight RAF
- No. 53 Squadron RAF
- No. 113 Squadron RAF
- No. 204 Advanced Flying School RAF
- No. 241 Operational Conversion Unit RAF
- No. 283 (Airborne Forces) Wing RAF
- No. 295 Squadron RAF
- No. 297 Squadron RAF
- No. 1528 (Radio Aids Training) Flight RAF
- No. 1529 (Beam Approach Training) Flight RAF
- No. 1555 (Radio Aids Training) Flight RAF
- No. 1556 (Radio Aids Training) Flight RAF
- No. 2706 Squadron RAF Regiment
- Central Flying School

=== Cold War ===
In the early years of the Cold War, the British and American governments reached an agreement under which elements of the USAF Strategic Air Command (SAC) would be based in the UK. Bases had already been established in East Anglia, at RAF Mildenhall and RAF Lakenheath, but they were considered to be vulnerable to bomber attack and airfields further behind the RAF fighter defences were sought. Four RAF airfields were selected to receive SAC units: RAF Brize Norton, RAF Fairford, RAF Greenham Common, and RAF Upper Heyford. In 1948, the Americans occupied RAF stations including Fairford, Brize Norton, Burtonwood, Greenham Common, Mildenhall, Lakenheath, and Woodbridge to build up a deterrent in Europe against the Soviets.

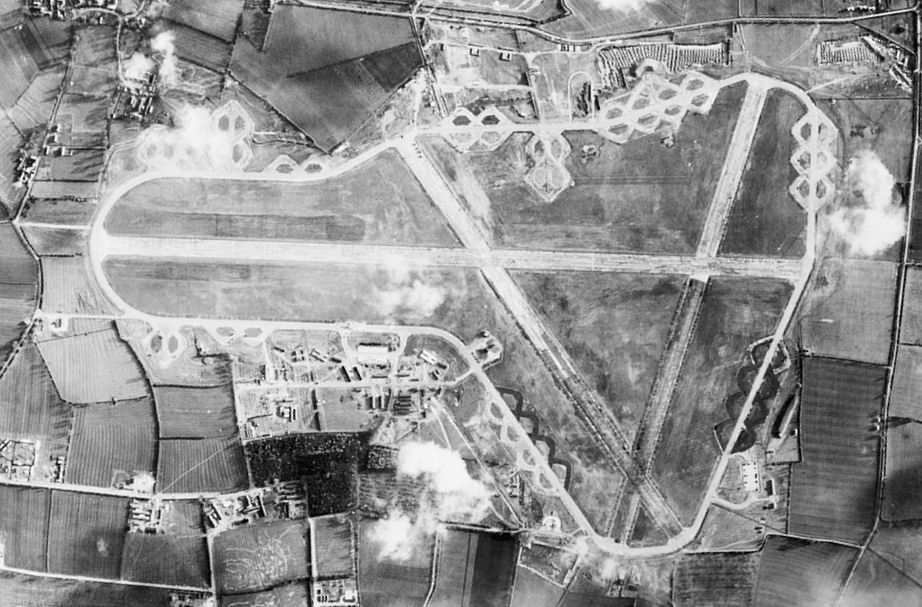
Aerial photograph of Fairford airfield, the bomb dump and ammunition dump are east (top) of the perimeter track, the technical site and barrack sites are on the north (lower left), 2 December 1943.

RAF Lyneham's position as the primary tactical transport base for the RAF was emphasised in February 1971 when Nos. 30 and 47 Squadrons were transferred from their old base at RAF Fairford. In 1965, RAF Fairford was the first home base of the RAF Aerobatic Team The Red Arrows.

In 1950, as a result of the beginning of the Cold War, the airfield was transferred to the United States Air Force for strategic bomber operations. A 10,000-foot (3,000 m) runway was constructed for long-range bomber operations.

The runway was completed in 1953 and served as a forward airbase for the first Convair B-36 Peacemaker aircraft from Carswell Air Force Base, Texas. The airfield later received B-47s, which were maintained at a heightened state of alert because of increased tensions with the Soviet Union.

Due to its long runway, Fairford was chosen in 1969 as the British test centre for the Concorde aircraft until 1977.

The USAF returned with Boeing KC-135 Stratotankers deployed on rotation from the many KC-135 bases in the USA. On 15 November 1978 the 11th Strategic Group (11 SG) was activated at RAF Fairford. It was not manned until the following February and used KC-135 aircraft and crews from SAC, Air National Guard, and USAF Reserve units until the 11 SG received its own aircraft in September 1979. It soon began aerial refuelling support for all USAF operations, deployments, and redeployments, as well as participating in NATO exercises.

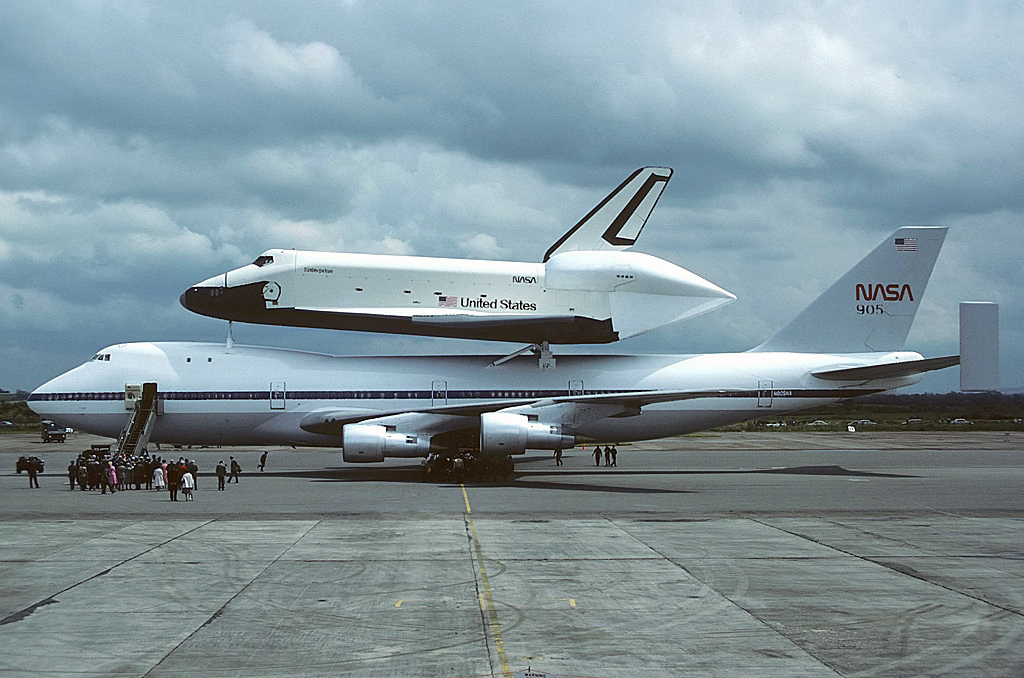
The shuttle carrier carrying Enterprise on its way to the Paris Air Show in 1983

Operations staff and maintenance personnel were permanently assigned, but aircraft, aircrews, and crew chiefs were temporarily assigned to the 11th Strategic Group for the European Tanker Task Force on rotation. Aircraft and crews operated from Riyadh, Saudi Arabia; Keflavik, Iceland; Zaragosa, Spain; Lajes Field, Azores; Sigonella NAS, Italy; and Hellenikon, Greece. The unit retained the 11th Strategic Group designation, but was inactivated on 7 August 1990.

KC-135 and KC-10 tankers deployed to Fairford supported Operation El Dorado Canyon against Libya in 1986. The KC-135s and KC-10s were withdrawn in 1990 and the station was returned to standby status, upgraded to "limited use" in the mid-1990s.

Due to RAF Fairford's location and infrastructure, the airfield is designated as a forward operating location for the USAF. It was used in the first Gulf War in 1991, with B-52s and KC-135s from Eaker AFB in Arkansas. It was later used during Operation Allied Force in 1999 when B-52s from Barksdale AFB, B-1Bs from Ellsworth AFB, and KC-135s from Mountain Home AFB were used.

=== 21st century ===
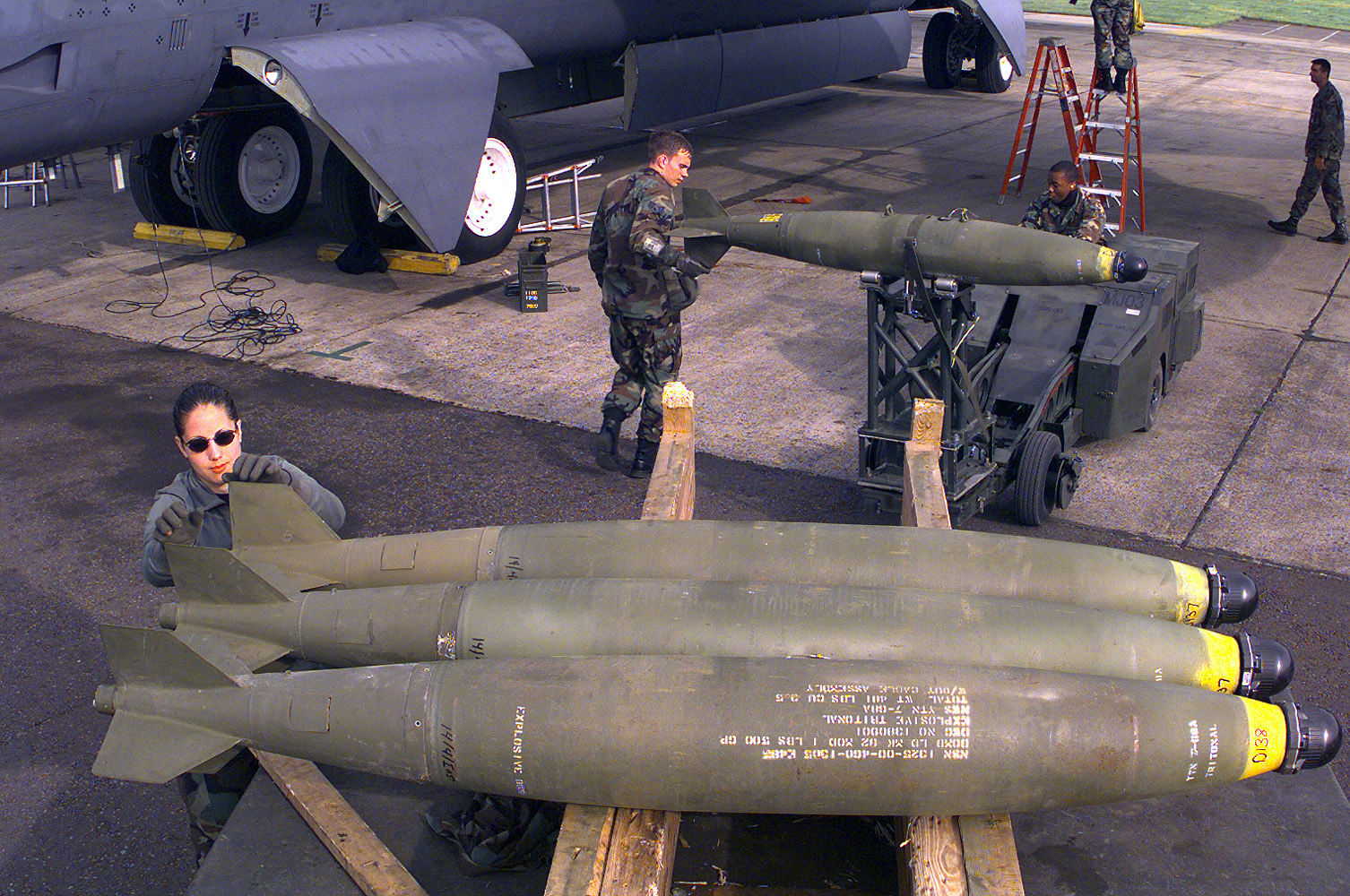
Crew members loading Mark 82 bombs onto a B-52

In the 2003 Iraq War, Operation Iraqi Freedom included B-52s based at Minot AFB, but flying from Fairford. In recent years, the airfield has been occasionally used by American B-2 Spirit stealth bombers and is frequently visited by U-2 aircraft.

Due to the deteriorating airfield facilities and its unique NATO heavy bomber mission, RAF Fairford underwent a $100 million upgrade of its runway and fuel systems in the largest NATO-funded airfield construction project within a NATO country since the end of the Cold War. This work lasted from May 2000 through May 2002. Additional improvements continued until 2008, including the construction of two climate-controlled hangars for B-2 stealth bombers and a low-observability maintenance dock.

On 14 January 2004, the 420th Air Base Group (420 ABG) was established at RAF Fairford to improve the control of its geographically separated units (GSUs) that had been aligned beneath the 100th Air Refueling Wing at RAF Mildenhall. These units are assigned to airfields at RAF Fairford, RAF Croughton, RAF Alconbury, and RAF Molesworth. The 420 ABG reported directly to Third Air Force until 26 May 2004, when the 38th Combat Support Wing (38 CSW) was established at Sembach Annex, Germany.

The construction of two climate-controlled hangars was completed in December 2004. At a cost of £12.2 million ($19 million), the hangars were designed to accommodate the B-2A Spirit and allow for maintenance of its specialist low-observable coating.

On 12 May 2005, the USAF activated the 501st Combat Support Wing, with headquarters at RAF Alconbury, to provide support to its GSUs in the UK. The USAF withdrew all its uniformed personnel from RAF Alconbury by September 2010, leaving a civilian operating unit to maintain the base on a "care and maintenance" basis. Until its runway was dug up, the base had been a designated standby airfield for heavy bomber operations.

In September 2014, Fairford was used as the staging base for US President Barack Obama's trip to the NATO conference held in Newport, Wales. VC-25A "Air Force 1" (AF1) aircraft carrying the President and his entourage and support aircraft arrived on 3 September, the US Secretary of State John Kerry also arrived in his own USAF C-32 aircraft. Air Force One with President Obama departed for Washington 5 September after an impromptu visit to Stonehenge on his way from Newport back to RAF Fairford.

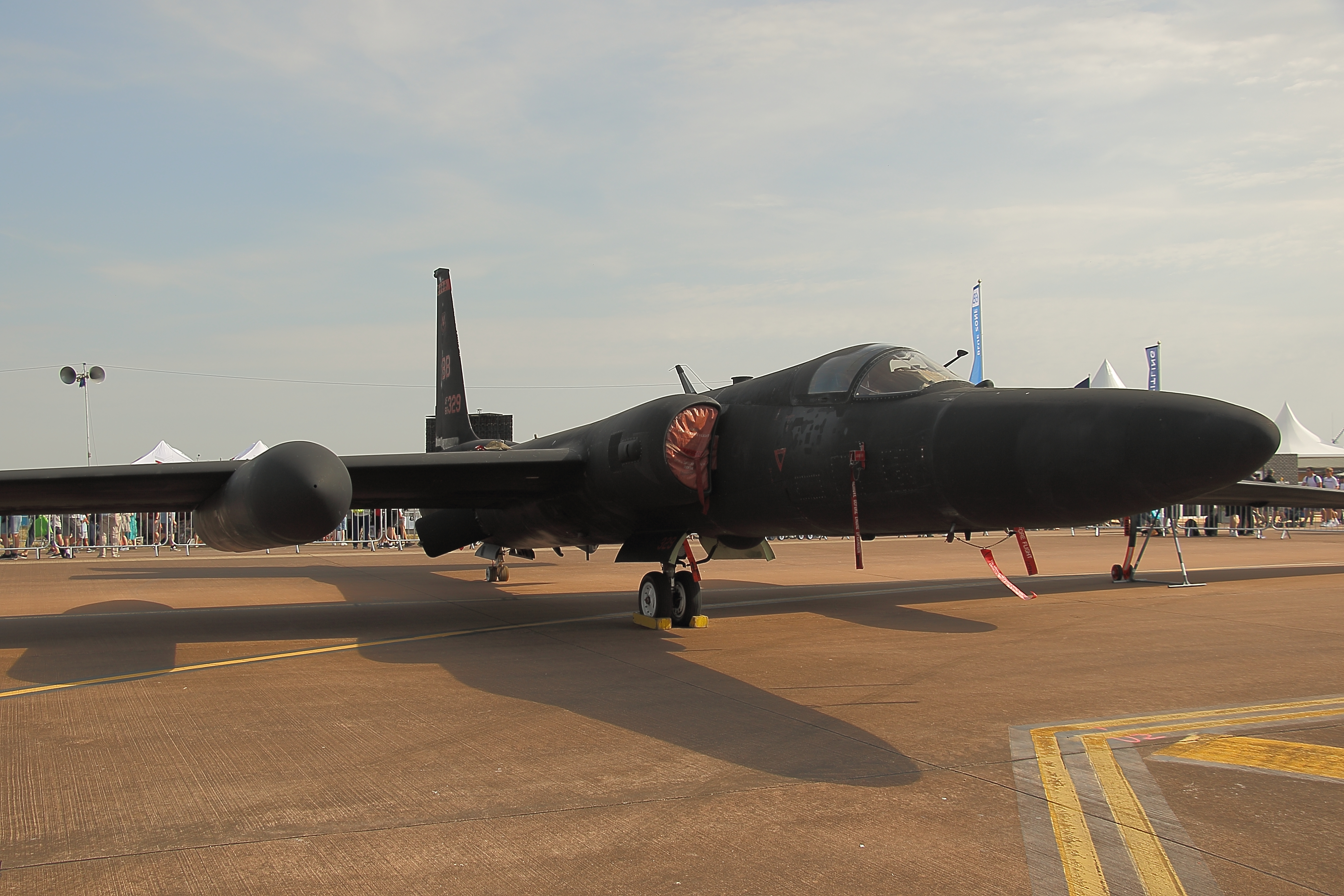
Lockheed U-2S Dragon Lady 68-10329 at RIAT, 2022: This aircraft was on detachment with the 99th ERS.

Since June 2014, RAF Fairford has seen regular heavy bomber exercises return with B-52H and B-2A, and in September 2016, B-1B aircraft for short-duration exercises by Air Force Global Strike Command and USAF Reserve units from Barksdale, Minot, Whiteman, and Dyess Air Force Bases. These exercises include participation in NATO exercises Baltops, Saber Strike, and Ample Strike. Baltops, mainly a maritime exercise, takes place off the Baltic states of Estonia, Latvia and Lithuania, while Saber Strike saw the B-52s flying close air-support missions in Poland. Taking advantage of B-52 deployment in 2014 were two flights of two B-2 Spirits, which made brief visits to Fairford as part of Global Power training flights. The Ample Strike exercise in September 2016 was the first time that USAF Reserve had deployed two types of heavy bombers (B-1Bs and B-52Hs) under the same parent operating wing (307BW). March 2019 saw the largest deployment of B-52Hs to RAF Fairford since Operation Iraqi Freedom in 2003, when six bombers arrived from the 2nd Bomb Wing.

In November 2018, RAF announced that the 95th Reconnaissance Squadron and 488th Intelligence Squadron would relocate to Fairford by 2024. The squadrons, based at RAF Mildenhall in Suffolk, are both part of the 55th Operations Group and support Boeing RC-135 surveillance aircraft when forward deployed on temporary duty to the UK from the United States. The move, part of the US Department of Defense's European Infrastructure Consolidation programme, was expected to see 500 personnel and RC-135 operations transfer to Fairford. In December, the proposal was cancelled and Mildenhall was confirmed to be retained as the RC-135's UK operating location.

In September 2019, the 99th Expeditionary Reconnaissance Squadron began a Lockheed U-2S Dragon Lady detachment from Beale Air Force Base, California.

On 22 August 2020, six B-52H bombers from the 23rd Bomb Squadron, 5th Bomb Wing, Minot AFB, deployed to RAF Fairford for a series of exercises with NATO and allied countries. On 28 August 2020, in a single-day mission dubbed Allied Sky, B-52Hs overflew all 30 NATO countries; four of the six B-52Hs deployed at RAF Fairford flew the European portion, whilst two Minot-based B-52Hs flew over the United States and Canada.

The Defence Infrastructure Organisation (DIO) acquired 43.87 hectares (108.4 acres) of land to north-east of RAF Fairford in November 2000. Planning permission was granted August 2021 to allow the land to be incorporated into the station boundary. Previously part of Horcott Quarry, the land forms part of the Cotswold Water Park lake system, which is designated as a site of special scientific interest. The DIO indicated that the land would be used to enhance station security and improve bird hazard management, as well as for military exercises and recreation.

Between December 2021 and December 2022, work was undertaken to resurface taxiways and aircraft parking stands located in the northeastern part of the airfield. Over 1,200 m of taxiway surfacing was replaced, with two parking stands removed and 11 replaced. Drainage infrastructure and airfield ground lighting were also upgraded.

In February 2022, four B-52H bombers from the 69th Bomb Squadron were deployed to RAF Fairford for six weeks.

In August 2024, a Northrop Grumman RQ-4B Global Hawk deployed to and operated from RAF Fairford for the first time.

==== During 2026 Iran war ====
In March 2026, American B-1 Lancer and B-52 bombers were deployed to RAF Fairford as part of the 2026 US–Israeli offensive on Iran. The UK initially denied US President Donald Trump's request for United States use of the base, but on 1 March 2026, Prime Minister Keir Starmer gave permission for American aircraft to use the base for "defensive purposes".

==== September 2026 incident ====
On 27 September 2026, a major incident was declared near the base after five men were arrested on suspicion of offences under the Explosives Act. Residents from about 85 households in the nearby village of Whelford were evacuated to a local leisure centre as a precaution, while the British Army explosive ordnance disposal team examined three vehicles, and Gloucestershire Constabulary established a cordon in the area. Later that day, it was reported that Counter Terrorism Police were leading the investigation. The following day the five men were released on bail, and The Times reported that no explosives had been found.

Prime Minister Andy Burnham convened COBRA on 28 September, and on 30 September, told the BBC that there were "... strong indications that Iran played a part in what happened over the weekend at RAF Fairford", earlier in the week Iran's embassy in ‌London rejected what it described as "unfounded and malicious speculations" linking Tehran to the incident.

On 4 October, all the USAF bombers were withdrawn from the base and returned to the United States, which Donald Trump attributed to "some threats" from people known to the US, and later said "they would be linked to Iran". A Downing Street spokesperson stated that the military site was now safe. In October 2026, British anti-terrorism police charged two British men with security offenses associated with the incident.

On 10 November, The US Department of Justice charged three Iran-backed agents who, it said, "orchestrated a terrorist plot at an air force base in the United Kingdom", including the September 2026 incident at RAF Fairford.

== Role and operations ==
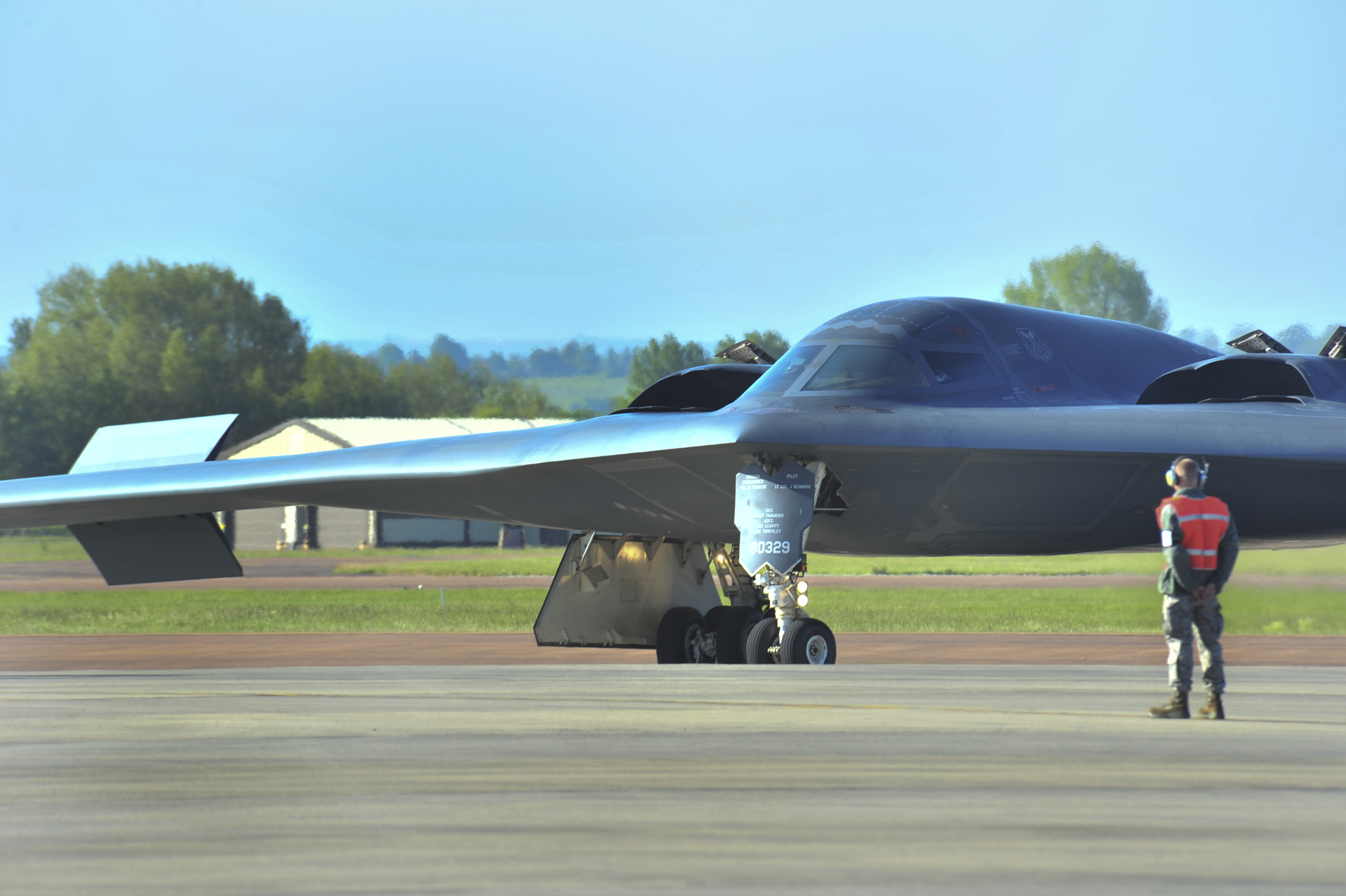
A USAF B-2A Spirit taxis after landing at RAF Fairford in June 2015.

=== Ownership and administration ===
RAF Fairford is owned by the British Ministry of Defence. Although designated as an RAF station, it is made available to the US Department of Defense under the 1951 NATO Status of Forces Agreement and other arrangements. The use of the station for combat operations is a joint decision between the British and US governments.

=== Security ===
Security outside the perimeter of the station is the responsibility of the Ministry of Defence Police, whereas security within the station is provided by the US Visiting Forces.

On 1 April 2006, RAF Fairford was designated as a protected site for the purposes of Section 128 of the Serious Organised Crime and Police Act 2005. The effect of the act was to make a person trespassing into the station a specific criminal offence.

=== Operations ===
RAF Fairford is a forward operating location made available to the United States by the UK government. It is the only such location in Europe and is predominately used by USAF deployments of the B-1B Lancer, B-2A Spirit, and B-52H Stratofortress aircraft taking part in Air Force Global Strike Command's bomber task force missions.

Since September 2019, Fairford has hosted a detachment of Lockheed U-2S Dragon Lady reconnaissance aircraft, operated by the 99th ERS.

Base and mission support is provided by the 420th Air Base Squadron, a GSU of the 501st Combat Support Wing (headquartered at Fairford), based at RAF Alconbury in Cambridgeshire.

== Based units ==
Notable units based at RAF Fairford:

=== United States Air Force ===
United States Air Forces in Europe - Air Forces Africa (USAFE-AFAFRICA)

- 501st Combat Support Wing
  - 422nd Air Base Group - originally constituted and activated January 1942 as 22 Air Depot Group
    - 420th Air Base Squadron
    - 420th Munitions Squadron

Air Combat Command (ACC)

- Sixteenth Air Force
  - 9th Reconnaissance Wing
    - 9th Operations Group
      - 99th Expeditionary Reconnaissance Squadron – Lockheed U-2S Dragon Lady

== Royal International Air Tattoo ==
The Royal International Air Tattoo is held annually over the third weekend in July. RIAT is held in support of the RAF Charitable Trust and has attracted an attendance of up to 185,000 spectators over the weekend, with several hundred military aircraft belonging to air-arms from around the world taking part in static and flying displays. On 4 November 2026, it was announced that RIAT will permanently move to MOD Boscombe Down in Wiltshire, beginning from 2027.

== Former RAF Fairford unit emblems ==
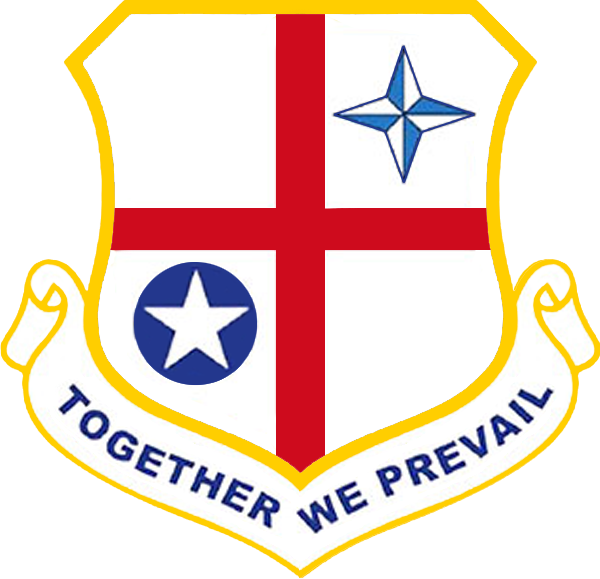
420th Air Base Group

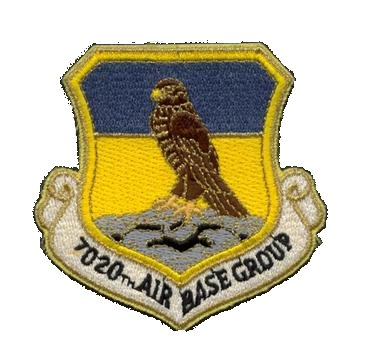
7020th Air Base Group

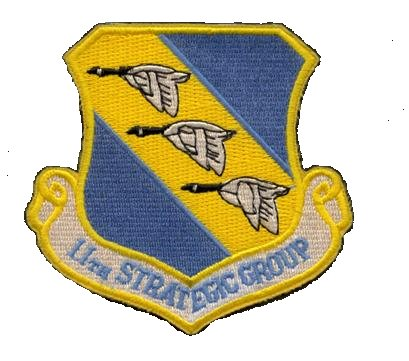
11th Strategic Group

== See also ==
- List of Royal Air Force stations
- Strategic Air Command in the United Kingdom
- United States Air Forces in Europe
- United States Air Force in the United Kingdom
