= Whigstreet =

Coordinates: 56.585947°N 2.844955°W

- Location within Angus
- OS grid reference: NO482441
- Council area: Angus
- Lieutenancy area: Angus
- Country: Scotland
- Sovereign state: United Kingdom
- Post town: FORFAR
- Postcode district: DD8
- Dialling code: 01307
- Police: Scotland
- Fire: Scottish
- Ambulance: Scottish
- UK Parliament: Angus
- Scottish Parliament: Angus South

Whigstreet is a village in the county of Angus, Scotland, between the towns of Forfar and Carnoustie. Nearby lie the remains of a temporary Roman marching camp dating to the third century AD.
