= Whelford =

Village in Gloucestershire, England

Coordinates: 51.6886°N 1.7568°W

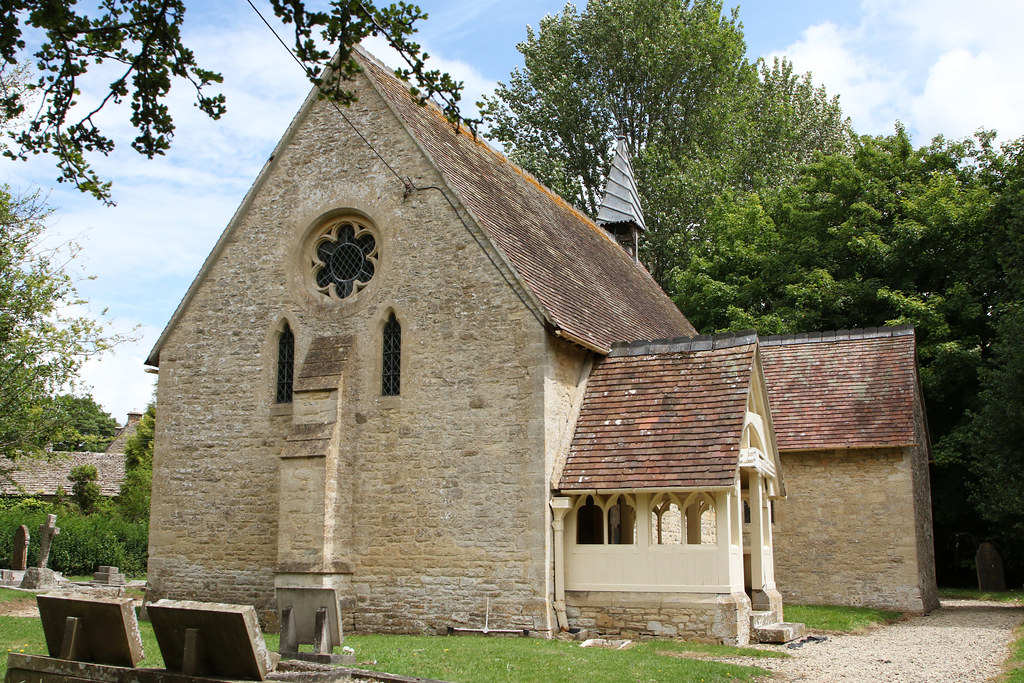
- St Anne's Church

- Location within Gloucestershire
- OS grid reference: SU16859891
- Civil parish: Kempsford
- District: Cotswold
- Shire county: Gloucestershire
- Region: South West
- Country: England
- Sovereign state: United Kingdom
- Post town: Fairford
- Postcode district: GL7
- Dialling code: 01285
- Police: Gloucestershire
- Fire: Gloucestershire
- Ambulance: South Western
- UK Parliament: South Cotswolds

Whelford is a village in the civil parish of Kempsford, in the Cotswold district, in the county of Gloucestershire, England. Whelford lies on the River Coln, 2 miles (3.2 km) south east of Fairford. In 1864, a chapel of ease was constructed in the Early English architectural style.

== Location ==
To the north-east of Whelford is the Whelford Pools nature reserve a Site of Special Scientific Interest run by the Gloucestershire Wildlife Trust.

Whelford is situated within the Cotswold Water Park which is home to 180 lakes. Located in the eastern section of the park, the lakes offer recreational and residential properties, by Yoo development, located less than 2 miles (3.2 km) to the north.

== History ==
Archaeological excavations conducted at Whelford Bowmoor, in 1983, 1985 and 1988, ahead of proposed gravel extraction, identified Romano-British farmstead with associated paddocks, trackways and field systems.

Between 1862 and 1864, St Annes's church, a chapel of ease designed by G. E. Street, was constructed in the Early English architectural style. The stone-built church has a round apse with three small trefoil-headed lancets. The roof is tiled and there is a lead-covered bellcote. A simple interior largely retains Street's original furnishings. It is a Grade II Listed building.

In 1870-72 the village had a population of 178.

== RAF Fairford ==
Whelford is near RAF Fairford, with Whelford Road running parallel to the easterly end of the runway. With RAF Fairford hosting United States Air Force personnel, there have been frequent deployments from the USAF to support military exercises.

In recent years deployments have included the B-2, B-52 and B-1 aircraft making Whelford Road a popular destination for aviation enthusiasts and photographers.

Whelford and the surrounding area also support the annual Royal International Air Tattoo (RIAT), the worlds largest military airshow. Due to its proximity to the air base, the village provides one of the main access routes for visitors attending RIAT with camping also on offer in the local area.

On 27 September 2026, a major incident was declared near the base after five men were arrested in Whelford on suspicion of offences under the Explosives Act 1875 and further arrested on suspicion of preparing a terrorist act under section 5 of the Terrorism Act 2006. Residents from about 85 households were evacuated to a local leisure centre as a precaution, while the British Army explosive ordnance disposal team examined three vehicles, and Gloucestershire Constabulary established a cordon in the area. No explosives were found, although some petrol, was recovered.

== Gallery ==
St Anne's church

St Anne's church, eastern end

Welford Mill

Barn at Welford Mill

Whelford Village Hall
