= Wheal Baddon =

Human settlement in United Kingdom

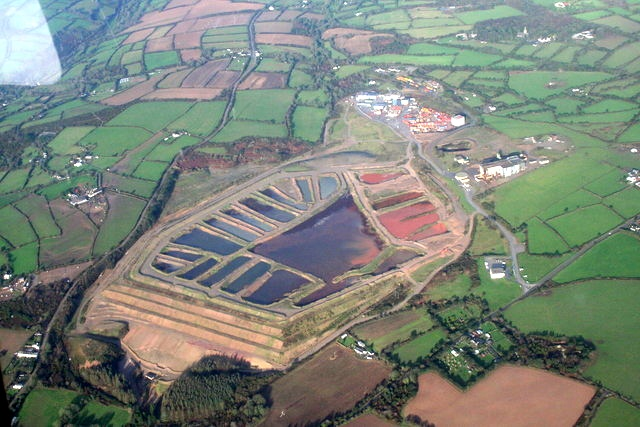

Wheal Baddon is a hamlet south of Baldhu in the county of Cornwall in the United Kingdom.

Wheal means 'mine'. The hamlet was named after the Great Wheal Baddon Mine, which operated in the area in the 1800s, According to the production records, between "1850 and 1870 the mine sold 3,379 tons of lead ore at 70% and 41,107 ounces of silver" and "Between 1854 and 1857 it raised and sold 1,137 tons of zinc ore as well as 26 tons of black tin between 1852 and 1872".
