= Wheal Frances =

Coordinates: 50.3295°N 5.1120°W

- Location within Cornwall
- OS grid reference: SW786523
- Civil parish: Perranzabuloe
- Unitary authority: Cornwall
- Ceremonial county: Cornwall
- Region: South West
- Country: England
- Sovereign state: United Kingdom
- Post town: TRURO
- Postcode district: TR4
- Dialling code: 01872
- Police: Devon and Cornwall
- Fire: Cornwall
- Ambulance: South Western
- UK Parliament: Truro and Falmouth

Wheal Frances is a village in Cornwall, England, UK. It is located in the civil parish of Perranzabuloe.

== Geography ==
Carnkief Pond, a Site of Special Scientific Interest is located to the north of the village. The site features 12 species of dragonfly and is noted for its importance to biology.

== Wheal Frances Mine ==
The village was noted for the Wheal Frances Mine of which many ruins remain.
