= Whipsiderry =

Hamlet in Cornwall, England

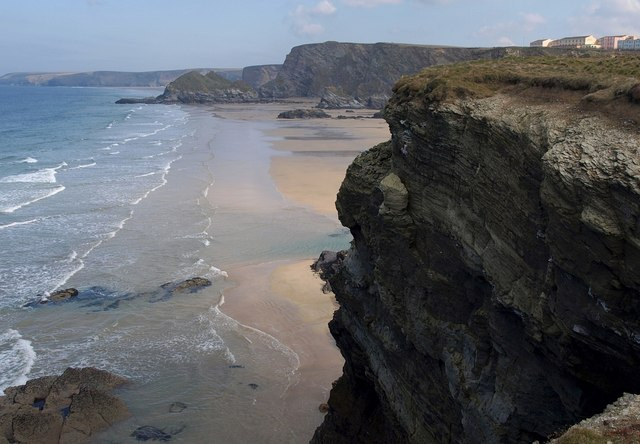
Whipsiderry Beach

Whipsiderry is a coastal hamlet north of Newquay in Cornwall, England, United Kingdom.

Part of the cliff face collapsed in 2023. No one was killed or injured.
