= Whistlefield, Dunbartonshire =

Coordinates: 56.0933°N 4.8369°W

Whistlefield
- Location within Argyll and Bute
- OS grid reference: NS236926
  - Edinburgh: 65 mi (105 km)
  - London: 370 mi (600 km)
- Council area: Argyll and Bute
- Country: Scotland
- Sovereign state: United Kingdom
- Post town: Helensburgh
- Postcode district: G84
- Dialling code: 01436

Roundabout at Whistlefield

Whistlefield is a location just north of Garelochhead on the B872 in Dunbartonshire, Scotland. There is a roundabout known locally as the "Whistlefield roundabout" on the A814 road. There is a viewpoint called the "Whistlefield viewpoint" with a picnic area and an associated carpark.

There is a modern housing development in the location, with the B872 called "Whistlefield Road" in the area.

== Former railway station ==
Whistlefield station on the West Highland Railway opened in 1896 and closed in 1964.
