= Whistlefield, Argyll =

Coordinates: 56.096205°N 4.984861°W

Whistlefield
- Location within Argyll and Bute
- OS grid reference: NS 14426 93276
  - Edinburgh: 70 mi (110 km)
- Council area: Argyll and Bute
- Lieutenancy area: Argyll and Bute
- Country: Scotland
- Sovereign state: United Kingdom
- Post town: DUNOON
- Postcode district: PA23
- Dialling code: 01369
- UK Parliament: Argyll, Bute and South Lochaber
- Scottish Parliament: Argyll and Bute

Whistlefield is a hamlet on the east shore of Loch Eck on the Cowal Peninsula, in Argyll and Bute, West of Scotland. It is home to the Category C listed building, the Whistlefield Inn, which was established around 1801–1804. The hamlet is within the Argyll Forest Park, which is itself part of the Loch Lomond and The Trossachs National Park.
