= Whilton Locks =

Coordinates: 52.2791°N 1.0979°W

Whilton/Long Buckby Locks
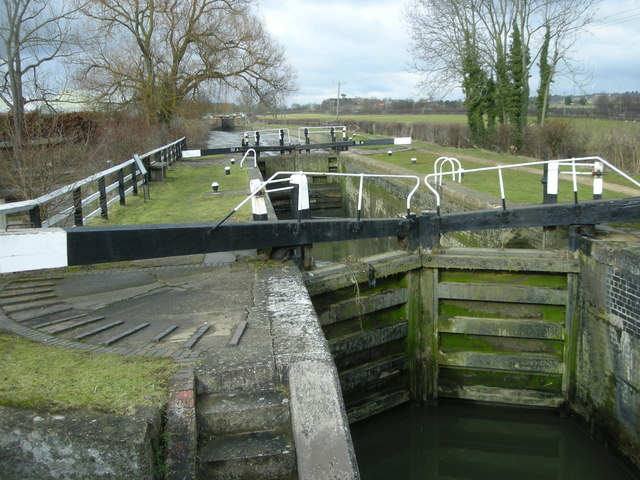
- The second lock of the Whilton flight
- Interactive map of Whilton/Long Buckby Locks
- Waterway: Grand Union Canal
- County: Northamptonshire
- Maintained by: Canal & River Trust
- Operation: Manual
- First built: 1796
- Length: 72 feet (21.9 m)
- Width: 14 feet 3 inches (4.34 m)
- Fall: 63 feet (19 m)
- Flight of 7 locks

Whilton Locks is the name of a flight of seven locks on the Grand Union Canal near Daventry, in the county of Northamptonshire, England. They are also referred to as Buckby Lock Flight.

== History ==
The Grand Junction Canal was authorised by an Act of Parliament on 30 April 1793, and was to run over 90 miles (140 km) from Braunston on the Oxford Canal to Brentford near London, where it would join the River Thames. Construction of the northern section, which included the Whilton locks at Buckby, was complicated by the need for two tunnels, one to the north of the locks near Braunston, which was 2,042 yards (1,867 m) long, and the other to the south at Blisworth, which was 3,057 yards (2,795 m) long. Despite encountering quicksands in Braunston Tunnel, it was finished on 21 June 1796, and the canal opened to Weedon Bec, around 2.7 miles (4.3 km) to the south of the locks. Shortly afterwards, it was extended further south to Blisworth, but there were serious problems with Blisworth Tunnel, which had failed in January 1796. William Jessop was the engineer and wanted to abandon the idea of a tunnel. He proposed to build 29 locks to get beyond Blisworth, but was persuaded to try a different alignment by three engineers who were brought in to advise. Low level headings were cut to drain the main workings of water, and the tunnel opened on 25 March 1805, the last part of the canal to be completed. The Grand Junction Canal became part of the Grand Union Canal in 1929, following amalgamation with the Regents Canal, the Warwick and Birmingham Canal and the Warwich and Napton Canal.

How a lock with a side pond works

Below the bottom lock was a long level pound stretching to beyond Blisworth Tunnel. The seven locks raised the level of the canal by 63 feet (19 m) to a fairly short summit pound, which passed through Braunston Tunnel and then descended through five locks to Braunston. The locks were built wide enough to take two narrow boats side by side, in the hope that the canals beyond the northern terminus could be persuaded to widen their locks and that wide barges carrying 70 tons could be operated.

The locks at Buckby were all built with side ponds, to conserve water. These are maintained at an intermediate level between the upper and lower pound. When a lock is emptying, water from the top of the lock fills the side pond, and the rest is then discharged to the lower pound. When a lock is filling, the bottom of the lock is filled from the pond, and the rest is drawn from the upper pound. Typically, this system uses 40 per cent less water, but the ponds have been disused for a long time, and an electric pump is now used to pump water from the bottom of the flight to the top. The Grand Junction Canal experimented with side ponds from the early 1800s. The locks at Bourne End had several radial ponds, but use of the ponds was abandoned because it took too long to use the lock. Those at Buckby had two rectangular side ponds per lock, at different levels, and this design was eventually installed at most locks between Buckby and lock 45 at Bulbourne, the junction with the Wendover Arm.

== Location ==
The locks are numbered from 7 at the top of the flight to 13 at the bottom. To the south of the flight is a long level pound, which stretches 14.6 miles (23.5 km) to the Stoke Bruerne Canal Museum and the top of the Stoke Bruerne flight of seven locks. Towards the southern end of this section is Blisworth Tunnel and Gayton Junction, where the Northampton Branch turns off to join the River Nene at Northampton. Just below the junction, the railway line from London to Rugby crosses the canal and then runs parallel to it. About 1 mile (1.6 km) below Whilton Locks, the M1 motorway approaches, and runs along the east bank, so that the bottom four locks are sandwiched between the railway and the motorway. The railway then crosses to the east bank, and the canal diverges to the west. Just before the final lock, the canal passes under Watling Street, once a Roman road and now part of the A5 road. The Leicester section of the Grand Union Canal then turns off at Norton Junction, and the canal continues on the level, passing through Braunston Tunnel to reach the top lock of the six that descend to Braunston, 3.5 miles (5.6 km) from the top of the Whilton flight.

The canal is 377 feet (115 m) above sea level at the top of the flight, and the locks drop the level by 63 feet (19 m) to 314 feet (96 m). Whilton Marina is located close to the bottom lock. It was set up in 1971 in a field beside the canal, and now has 200 private moorings, while another 50 are occupied by boats which are for sale. The marina offers a full range of services. Between locks 7 and 8 there is an early nineteenth-century bridge, resting on stone supports. The piers and parapets are made of brick, and the structure is grade II listed. Beside lock 9 is a cast iron milepost, dating from the same period, indicating that it is 5 miles (8 km) to Braunston, which is also listed.

== Bibliography ==
- Cumberlidge, Jane (2009). Inland Waterways of Great Britain (8th Ed.). Imray Laurie Norie and Wilson. ISBN 978-1-84623-010-3.
- Hadfield, Charles (1970). The Canals of the East Midlands. David and Charles. ISBN 0-7153-4871-X.
- Nicholson (2006). Nicholson Guides Vol 1: Grand Union, Oxford and the South East. Harper Collins. ISBN 978-0-00-721109-8.
- Shead, Jim (April 2004). "More than a Mooring - Whilton Marina". Waterways World. ISSN 0309-1422.
- Smithett, Robin (April 2012). "A bit on the side". Waterways World. ISSN 0309-1422.
