= 41st Air Refueling Squadron =

US Air Force unit

41st Air Refueling Squadron (later 41st Expeditionary Air Refueling Squadron)
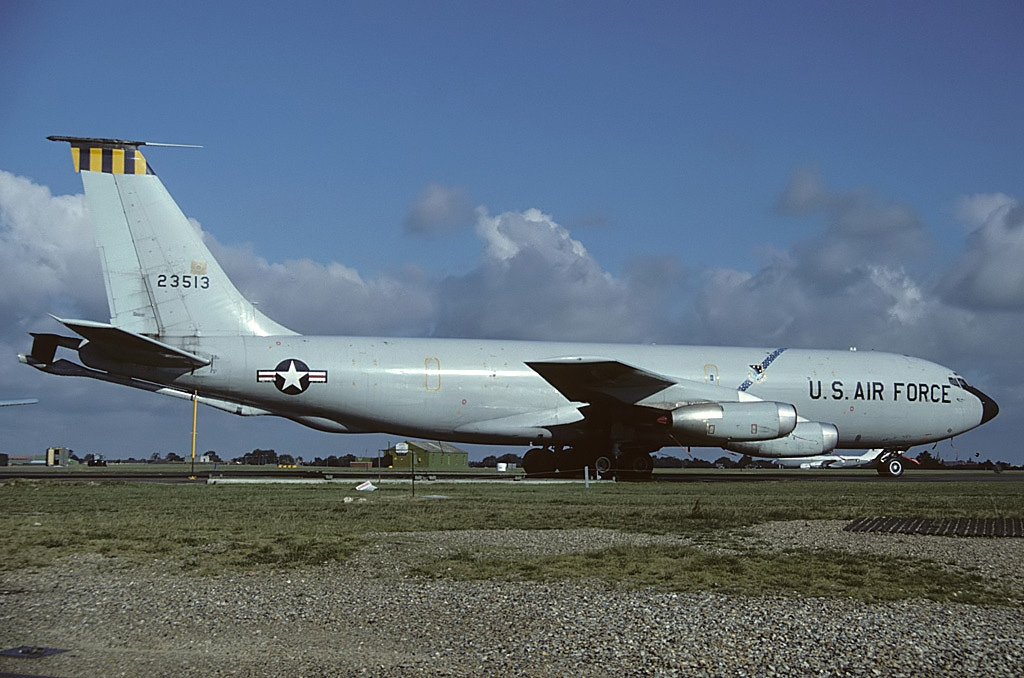
- Squadron KC-135A Stratotanker at RAF Mildenhall
- Active: 1944; 1944–1946; 1947–1949; 1958–1993
- Country: United States
- Branch: United States Air Force
- Role: Aerial refueling
- Engagements: Pacific Theater of Operations
- Decorations: Distinguished Unit Citation; Air Force Outstanding Unit Award

Insignia
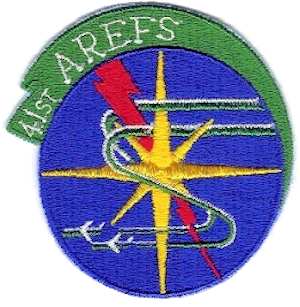
- Patch with 41st Air Refueling Squadron emblem

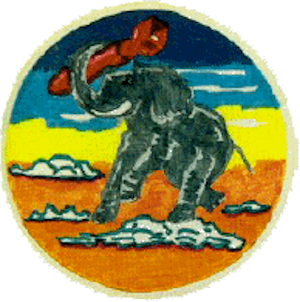
- 41st Bombardment Squadron emblem (Note: Approved 17 April 1945. Description: On a disc, orange in base, shaded up to sky blue, within an ultramarine blue border, a large, gray elephant with white tusks, running toward dexter, and holding aloft in the trunk a very large, red aerial bomb, in front of white, cirrus cloud formations, edged light turquoise blue, and marked red violet on under side, all leaving white vapor trails to rear.)

The 41st Expeditionary Air Refueling Squadron is a provisional United States Air Force unit. It was last assigned to the 380th Operations Group at Griffiss Air Force Base, New York, where it was inactivated on 15 February 1993.

The squadron's earliest predecessor was activated in 1944 as the 41st Bombardment Squadron. After training in the United States with Boeing B-29 Superfortresses, it deployed to Guam, where it participated in the strategic bombing campaign against Japan. It was awarded a Distinguished Unit Citation for its combat operations. Following V-J Day, the squadron remained in the Pacific until inactivating in 1946. It was again activated in the reserve in 1947, but was not fully manned or equipped before inactivating again in 1949.

The 41st Air Refueling Squadron was activated at Griffiss Air Force Base, New York in 1959 and equipped with Boeing KC-135 Stratotankers as Strategic Air Command dispersed its bomber and tanker force to protect it from a surprise attack by the Soviet Union. It conducted air refueling operations from Griffiss until inactivating in 1993. During the Vietnam War, it deployed aircraft and aircrew to Southeast Asia. In 1985, the two squadrons were consolidated into a single unit. In 2002, the consolidated unit was converted to provisional status as the 41st Expeditionary Refueling Squadron and assigned to Air Mobility Command to activate or inactivate as needed.

== History ==
=== World War II ===
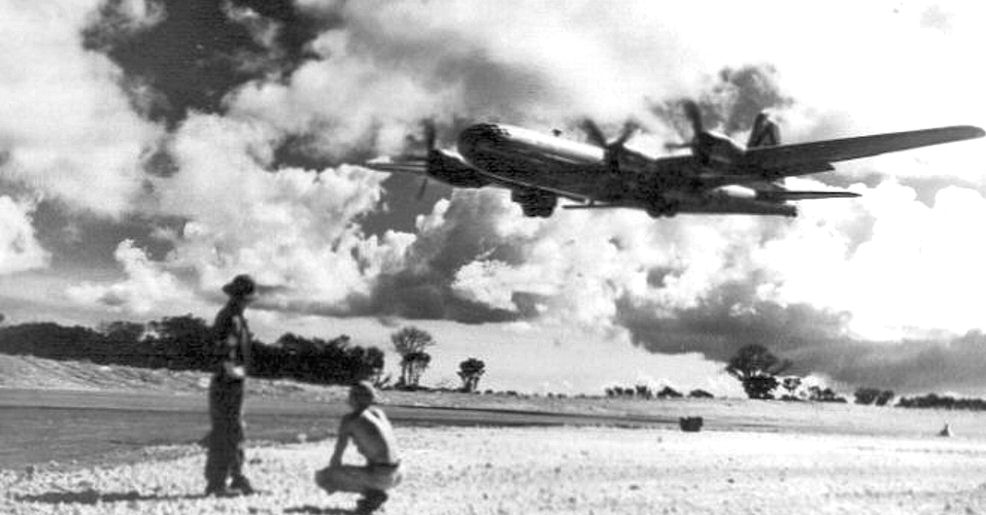
501st Bombardment Group B-29 taking off from Northwest Field, Guam 1945

The first predecessor of the squadron was activated on 1 April 1944 as the 41st Bombardment Squadron at Dalhart Army Air Field, Texas for training with Boeing B-29 Superfortresses. however, before it became much more than a "paper" unit, it was inactivated on 10 May. However, the squadron was again activated on 1 June 1944, when it became one of the original squadrons of the 501st Bombardment Group. In August, the 501st Group and its squadrons moved to Harvard Army Air Field, Nebraska and began to equip with Superfortresses. The squadron completed its training and departed for the Pacific on 7 March 1945.

The squadron was equipped with the Bell Aircraft manufactured B-29B, which was designed to save weight by removing all of the guns and sighting equipment used on other B-29s, except the tail gun, allowing the B-29B to fly a little higher and a little further. The B-29B also had two new radar units installed, the AN/APQ-7 Eagle radar for bombing and navigation and the AN/APG-15 for aiming the tail gun. These two radar units gave the B-29B a distinctive shape as the APQ-7 antenna appeared as a small wing under the fuselage, between the two bomb bay doors and the APG-15 added a ball shaped antenna to the tail of the aircraft below the tail guns.

The squadron arrived at its combat station, Northwest Field on Guam on 14 April 1945. The squadron flew its first combat mission on 19 June 1945, attacking Japanese fortifications on the Truk Atoll. Later that month, on 26 June, it flew its first mission attacking a target in Japan. For the remainder of the war, it operated principally against the enemy's petroleum industry on the island of Honshu. These attacks included missions against the Maruzen oil refinery at Shimotso, the Utsobo oil refinery at Yokkaichi and the petroleum center at Kawasaki during the week beginning on 6 July 1945. For its performance on these missions, the squadron was awarded the Distinguished Unit Citation.

Following V-J Day, the squadron dropped supplies to Allied prisoners of war in Japan, Korea, Manchuria and China. It remained at Northwest Field until May 1946, when it became non-operational, and was inactivated there on 10 June 1946.

=== Air Force reserve ===
The squadron was reactivated as a reserve unit under Air Defense Command (ADC) at Long Beach Municipal Airport, California in July 1947, where it was assigned to the 448th Bombardment Group. Its training was supervised by the 416th AAF Base Unit (later the 2347th Air Force Reserve Training Center). Although nominally a B-29 unit, it is not clear whether or not the squadron was fully staffed or equipped. In 1948 Continental Air Command (ConAC) assumed responsibility for managing reserve and Air National Guard units from ADC. In June 1949 ConAC reorganized its reserve units under the wing base organization, and in connection with this reorganization, the squadron was inactivated and replaced by the 711th Bombardment Squadron.

=== Air refueling ===
During the Cold War, Strategic Air Command (SAC) bases with large concentrations of bombers made attractive targets. SAC’s response was to break up its wings and scatter their aircraft over a larger number of bases. As part of this dispersal program, in August 1958, SAC organized the 4039th Strategic Wing at Griffiss Air Force Base, New York. The 41st Air Refueling Squadron was activated on 5 January 1959 as the wing's first operational flying squadron and began to equip with Boeing KC-135A Stratotankers.

After it became operational, in 1960, the squadron began to maintain one third of its aircraft on fifteen minute alert, fully fueled and ready for combat to reduce its vulnerability to a Soviet missile strike. This was increased to half the squadron's aircraft in 1962. It conducted air refueling on a global scale to meet SAC commitments.

Soon after detection of Soviet missiles in Cuba, SAC placed additional KC-135s on alert to replace KC-135s devoted to maintaining 1/8 of the B-52 bomber force on airborne alert. On 24 October 1962, SAC went to DEFCON 2, placing all the squadron's aircraft on alert and increased the size of its forward deployed tanker task forces. On 27 November SAC returned to its normal alert posture.

In February 1963, The 416th Bombardment Wing assumed the aircraft, personnel and equipment of the 4039th wing, which was discontinued. The 4039th was a Major Command controlled (MAJCON) wing, which could not carry a permanent history or lineage, and SAC wanted to replace it with a permanent unit. The 41st was assigned to the newly-activated 416th Wing.

In December 1964, the squadron began deploying crews and aircraft to support the war in Southeast Asia, in Operation Young Tiger. These deployments continued until December 1975. These deployments reduced the alert posture of the squadron, and the ground alert program was finally ended on 17 September 1991. In September 1985, the 41st Bombardment Squadron and the 41st Air Refueling Squadron were consolidated into a single unit. During Operation Desert Storm it deployed an aircraft and crew to the 1702d Air Refueling Squadron (Provisional) at Seeb International Airport.

After SAC was disestablished and the air refueling mission was transferred to Air Mobility Command (AMC), the squadron was assigned to the 380th Operations Group, as AMC consolidated its air refueling operations. It was inactivated on 15 February 1992. In 2002, the squadron was converted to provisional status as the 41st Expeditionary Air Refueling Squadron, but has not been active since then.

== Lineage ==
41st Bombardment Squadron

- Constituted as the 41st Bombardment Squadron, Very Heavy on 28 March 1944

Activated on 1 April 1944
Inactivated on 10 May 1944

- Activated on 1 June 1944

Inactivated on 10 June 1946 (not operational after c. 21 May 1946)

- Activated in the reserve on 12 July 1947

Inactivated on 27 June 1949

- Consolidated with the 41st Air Refueling Squadron as the 41st Air Refueling Squadron on 19 September 1985

41st Air Refueling Squadron

- Constituted as the 41st Air Refueling Squadron, Heavy in 1958

Activated on 5 January 1959

- Consolidated with the 41st Bombardment Squadron on 19 September 1985

Redesignated 41st Air Refueling Squadron on 1 September 1991
Inactivated on 15 February 1993

- Redesignated 41st Expeditionary Air Refueling Squadron and converted to provisional status on 12 June 2002

=== Assignments ===
- 6th Bombardment Group, 1 April – 10 May 1944 (Note: So in Maurer, Combat Squadrons, p. 190. However, the 6th Bombardment Group (Heavy) had been disbanded in the Panama Canal Zone on 1 November 1943. The 6th Bombardment Group, Very Heavy was not activated at Dalhart until 19 April 1944. Maurer, Combat Units, p. 41. It seems likely the squadron was assigned directly to Second Air Force for the two weeks until the 6th Group was activated.)
- 501st Bombardment Group, 1 June 1944 – 10 June 1946
- 448th Bombardment Group, 12 July 1947 – 27 June 1949
- 4039th Strategic Wing, 5 January 1959
- 416th Bombardment Wing, 1 February 1963
- 416th Operations Group, 1 September 1991
- 380th Operations Group, 1 June 1992 – 15 February 1993
- Air Mobility Command to activate or inactivate as needed, 12 June 2002

=== Stations ===
- Dalhart Army Air Field, Texas, 1 April – 10 May 1944
- Dalhart Army Air Field, Texas, 1 June 1944
- Harvard Army Air Field, Nebraska, 23 August 1944 – 7 March 1945
- Northwest Field, Guam, 14 April 1945 – 10 June 1946
- Long Beach Municipal Airport, California, 12 July 1947 – 27 June 1949
- Griffiss Air Force Base, New York, 5 January 1959 – 15 February 1993

=== Aircraft ===
- Boeing B-29 Superfortress, 1944–1946
- Boeing KC-135 Stratotanker, 1959–1993

=== Awards and campaigns ===
Award streamer	Award	Dates	Notes
	Distinguished Unit Citation	6 July–13 July 1945	Japan, 41st Bombardment Squadron
	Air Force Outstanding Unit Award	1 July 1975-30 June 1976	41st Air Refueling Squadron
	Air Force Outstanding Unit Award	1 July 1976-30 June 1977	41st Air Refueling Squadron
	Air Force Outstanding Unit Award	1 July 1978-30 June 1979	41st Air Refueling Squadron
	Air Force Outstanding Unit Award	15 September 1981-31 October 1982	41st Air Refueling Squadron
	Air Force Outstanding Unit Award	1 July 1984-30 June 1986	41st Air Refueling Squadron
	Air Force Outstanding Unit Award with Combat "V" Device	1 July 1989-30 June 1991	41st Air Refueling Squadron

Campaign Streamer	Campaign	Dates	Notes
	Air Offensive, Japan	14 April 1945–2 September 1945	41st Bombardment Squadron
	Eastern Mandates	14 April 1945–14 April 1944	41st Bombardment Squadron
	Western Pacific	17 April 1945–2 September 1945	41st Bombardment Squadron
	Defense of Saudi Arabia	2 August 1990 – 16 January 1991	509th Air Refueling Squadron
	Liberation and Defense of Kuwait	17 January 1991 – 11 April 1991	509th Air Refueling Squadron
