= 501st Combat Support Wing =

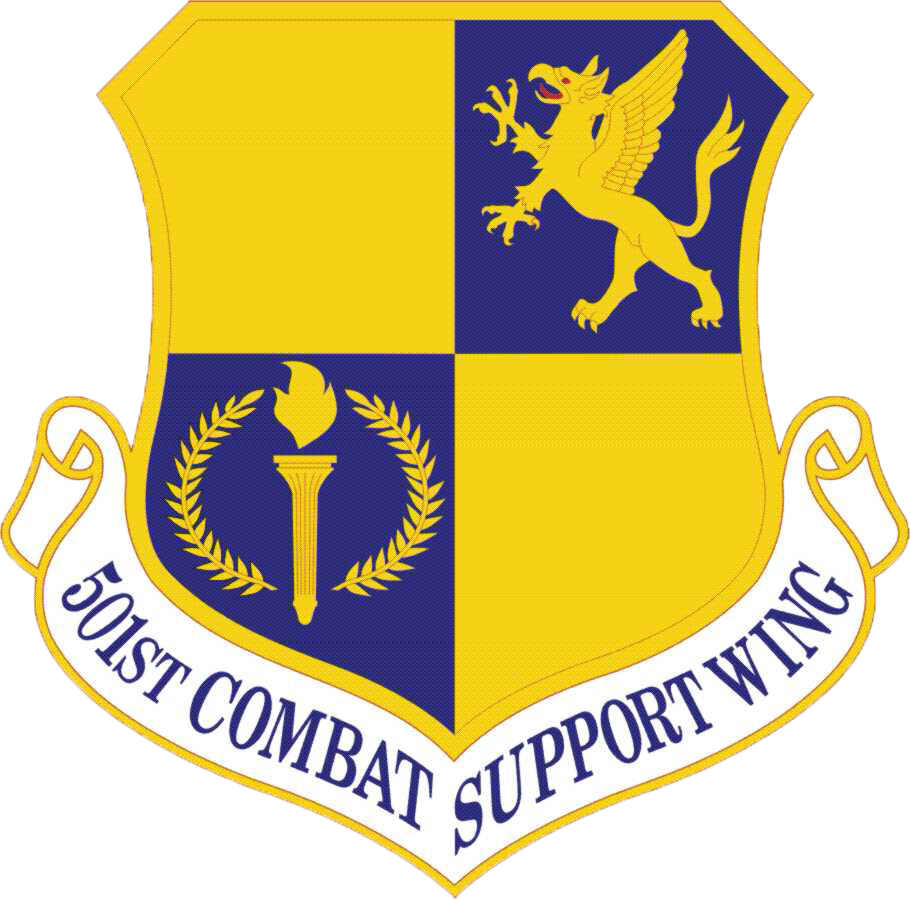
- Wing emblem
- Active: 1944–1946; 1956–1958; 1982–1991; 2005 – present
- Country: United States
- Branch: United States Air Force
- Type: Combat support wing
- Role: Administrative and mission support wing
- Size: c. 2,000 personnel
- Part of: US Air Forces in Europe – Air Forces Africa (Third Air Force)
- Headquarters: RAF Fairford, United Kingdom
- Nickname: Pathfinders
- Motto: Pathfinders "light the way"
- Website: Official website

Commanders
- Current commander: Colonel Michael J. Jewell

The 501st Combat Support Wing is an administrative support wing of the United States Air Force, based at RAF Fairford, United Kingdom. It is one of three wings located in the United Kingdom as components of the Third Air Force and United States Air Forces in Europe – Air Forces Africa (USAFE).

== History ==
The first predecessor of the 501st Wing was activated on 1 June 1944 as the 501st Bombardment Group at Dalhart Army Air Field, Texas for training with Boeing B-29 Superfortresses. Its components were the 21st, 41st and 485th Bombardment Squadrons. In August, the 501st Group and its squadrons moved to Harvard Army Air Field, Nebraska and began to equip with Superfortresses. The group completed its training and departed for the Pacific on 7 March 1945.

The group was equipped with the Bell Aircraft manufactured B-29B, which was designed to save weight by removing all of the guns and sighting equipment used on other B-29s, except the tail gun, allowing the B-29B to fly a little higher and a little further. The B-29B also had two new radar units installed, the AN/APQ-7 Eagle radar for bombing and navigation and the AN/APG-15 for aiming the tail gun. These two radar units gave the B-29B a distinctive shape as the APQ-7 antenna appeared as a small wing under the fuselage, between the two bomb bay doors and the APG-15 added a ball shaped antenna to the tail of the aircraft below the tail guns.

The group arrived at its combat station, Northwest Field on Guam on 14 April 1945. It flew its first combat mission on 19 June 1945, attacking Japanese fortifications on Truk. Later that month, on 26 June, it flew its first mission attacking a target in Japan. For the remainder of the war, the 501st operated principally against the enemy's petroleum industry on Honshu. These attacks included missions against the Maruzen oil refinery at Shimotso, the Utsobo oil refinery at Yokkaichi and the petroleum center at Kawasaki during the week beginning on 6 July 1945. For its performance on these missions, the group was awarded the Distinguished Unit Citation.

Following V-J Day, the group dropped supplies to Allied prisoners of war in Japan, Korea, Manchuria and China. It remained at Northwest Field until May 1946, when it became non-operational, and was inactivated there on 10 June 1946.

=== 701st Tactical Missile Wing ===
The second predecessor of the wing is the 701st Tactical Missile Wing, which was activated on 15 September 1956 at Hahn Air Base, West Germany. The first tactical missile wing in the U.S. Air Force when activated, it replaced the 7382d Guided Missile Group (Tactical), which United States Air Forces in Europe had established at Hahn on 1 February 1956. The 701st TMW controlled three tactical missile groups in Germany, each with one missile squadron of TM-61 Matador missiles and a support and maintenance squadron. In turn, the wing was inactivated on 18 June 1958 and replaced by the 38th Tactical Missile Wing.

=== 501st Tactical Missile Wing ===
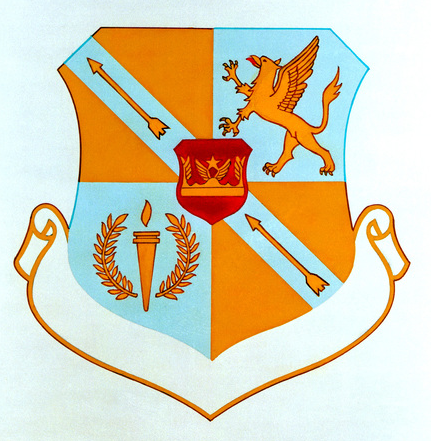
501st Tactical Missile Wing emblem

The 701st was redesignated as the 501st Tactical Missile Wing on 11 January 1982 and consolidated with the 501st Bombardment Group. It was activated on 1 July 1982, at RAF Greenham Common, England, to operate the Gryphon (BGM-109G) Ground Launched Cruise Missile (GLCM). The 501 TMW was inactivated on 31 May 1991 after ratification of the Intermediate-Range Nuclear Forces Treaty resulted in decommissioning of the BGM-109G. The USAF's first GLCM wing when it stood up, it was the also the last GLCM wing to be inactivated.

The 501 TMW's emblem was approved on 20 June 1957 and modified on 1 October 1982. It features a shield quartered: first and fourth quarters, Or, on a bend Azure an arrow of the first [color mentioned] per bend; second quarter, Azure, a griffin segreant Or, langued Gules; third quarter, Azure, a torch in pale, flamed, between two branches of olive Or; on an escutcheon of pretence Gules, an astral crown Or. The golden arrow signifies guided flight. The golden griffin, half eagle and half lion, symbolizes a warlike character with the cunning and intelligence of the eagle in flight and the courage and valor of the lion in battle. The torch and olive wreath represent the peacetime pursuit of knowledge and progress. The small shield and crown signify the authority of command. The astral crown denotes command in the air and obedience to guidance. The blue and yellow colors stand for the Air Force, and the red stands for the courage and strength with which the wing carries out its mission.

=== 501st Combat Support Wing ===
The unit was redesignated the 501st Combat Support Wing on 22 March 2005 and activated on 12 May 2005 at RAF Mildenhall, England, to manage and support geographically separated USAF units, installations and activities in the United Kingdom not directly supporting operations at RAF Mildenhall or RAF Lakenheath. Effective 1 May 2007, it relocated to RAF Alconbury.

The 501 CSW currently oversees and supports four Air Base Groups operating a total of eleven installations and operating locations in the U.K. and Norway; the 422d Air Base Group at Royal Air Force (RAF) Fairford and RAF Welford; the 421st Air Base Squadron at RAF Menwith Hill; the 422d Air Base Group at RAF Croughton; and the 423d Air Base Group at RAF Alconbury, including RAF Molesworth, RAF Upwood and Sola Air Station (what the USAF calls Stavanger Air Base) in Norway. The 501st CSW also serves as the administrative agent for NATO in the U.K.

RAF Fairford and RAF Welford are squadrons assigned to the 422d Air Base Group. Their mission is to receive, bed-down and sustain munitions to enable U.S. and NATO forces to conduct full-spectrum flying operations from USAFE's only bomber-forward operating location. RAF Fairford is a forward operating location for the Boeing B-52, the B-1 and the B-2 bomber aircraft. It also assists in U-2 aircraft deployment, deployed operations training and serves as an alternate landing site for the U.S. Space Shuttle. RAF Fairford annually hosts the world's largest military airshow called the Royal International Air Tattoo (RIAT); typically held in July.

RAF Welford comprises 806 acres and is bordered by a 31,680 foot fence-line. They are home to the U.S. Air Forces in Europe's second largest munitions hub. The installation currently maintains 15,000 bombs; over a $160 million stockpile.

RAF Menwith Hill houses the 421st Air Base Squadron. Their mission is to ensure a full range of base support services for an installation populace of 4,500 military, civilians, contractors and their families. The group hosts 10 multi-national, multi-service, multi-agency units performing U.S. and U.K. cryptologic missions and provides base mission support to RAF Menwith Hill. Menwith Hill Station serves as an integral part of the UKUSA intelligence network serving U.K., U.S. and their allied interests.

RAF Croughton houses the 422d Air Base Group whose mission is to provide installation support, services, force protection, and worldwide communications across the entire spectrum of operations. The group is the premier global communication provider in the U.K. and supports NATO, U.S. European Command, U.S. Central Command, Air Force Special Operations Command, U.S. Department of State operations and Ministry of Defense operations. The group sustains more than 450 C2 circuits; and supports 25 percent of all European Theater to continental United States (CONUS) communications.

RAF Alconbury houses the 423rd Air Base Group whose mission is to provide mission support services to the Joint Intelligent Operations Center Europe (JIOCEUR) Analytic Center (commonly known as the Joint Analysis Center), the NATO Intelligence Fusion Centre, and the RAF Alconbury, RAF Molesworth and RAF Upwood and Stavanger Air Base (Norway) communities. RAF Alconbury is also home to the 501st CSW headquarters staff and hosts a community of 6,000 individuals associated with more than 15 multi-service and multi-national units.

RAF Upwood used to house the medical and dental facilities for the RAF Alconbury, RAF Molesworth, and RAF Upwood communities; however, they were formally closed and a new facility was opened to accommodate these service members and their families on RAF Alconbury in 2012.

USAF activities at Sola Air Station ("Stavanger Air Base" to the USAF) in southern Norway are also under the 501st CSW, and the station houses the 426th Air Base Squadron. The squadron provides base-level support to 220 U.S. service members and their families at NATO's Joint Warfare Center. The squadron also supports "Operating Location-A" in Oslo, Norway, shipping for $50 million war readiness material and $900 million U.S. Marine Corps and U.S. Navy equipment.

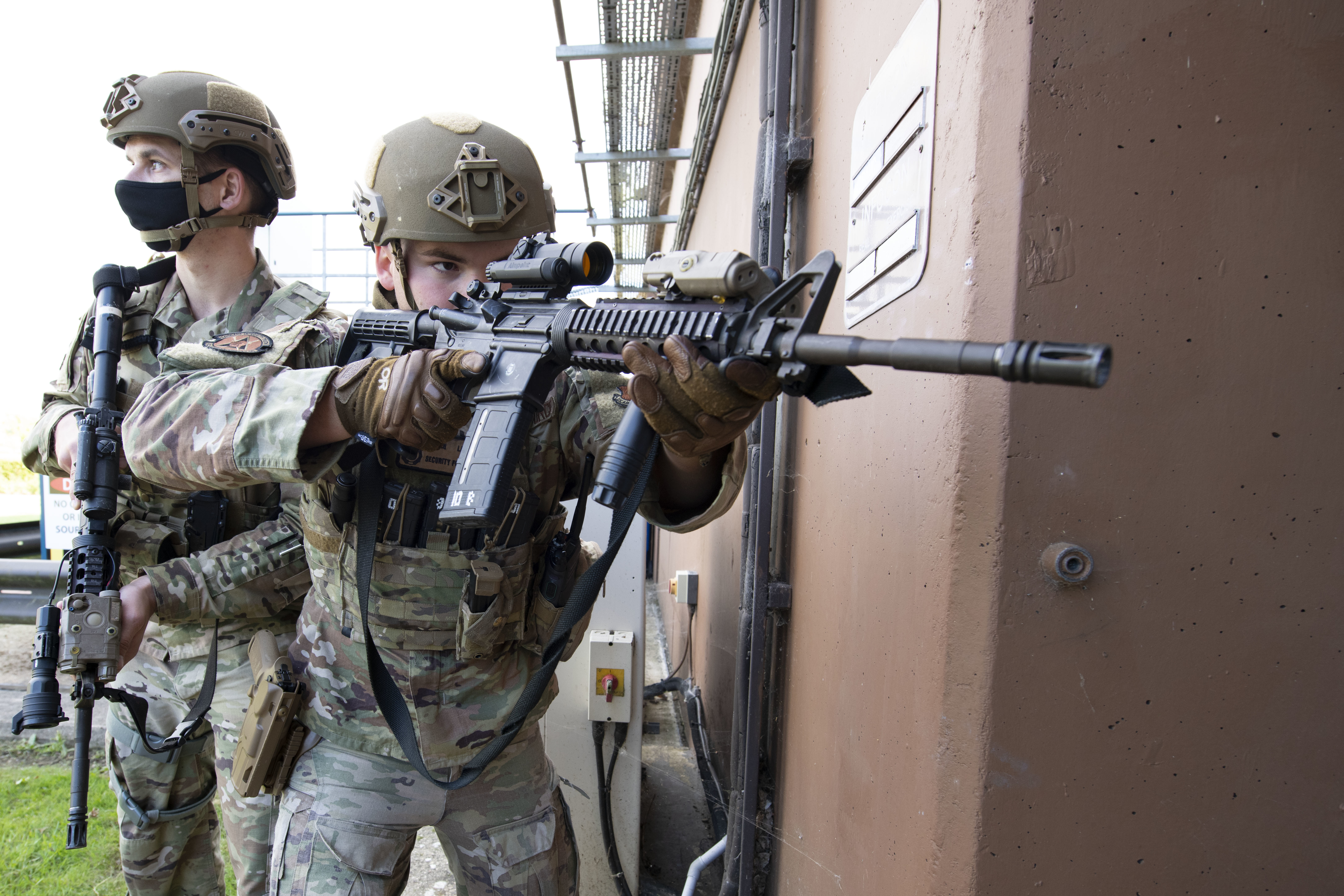
Airmen with the wing's 423rd Security Forces Squadron prepare to clear a building during an exercise at RAF Molesworth in 2020

In total, the 501st CSW has almost 2,600 U.S. military and civilian employees directly assigned, including non-appropriated fund employees. There are also 117 U.K. personnel who work directly for the wing in appropriated and non-appropriated positions and more than 180 U.K. Ministry of Defence Police, Defense Schools and our many tenant units along with family members and retirees who reside in the United Kingdom.

==== 2007–2008 leadership issues ====
The 423d Air Base Group commander, Col. Robert G. Steele, was dismissed from his position on 18 January 2008 by the 501 CSW commander after only 6 months in command. The reason Col. Kimberly Toney gave was "I lost confidence in Col. Steele's ability to lead the group." No criminal charges were filed against Col. Steele. The group commander of RAF Croughton, Col. John Jordan, was brought in to dually command the group at RAF Alconbury. The 501 CSW commander acknowledged the period was a "Painful challenge" and the 501 CSW commander (Col. Kimberly Toney) made a statement in an interview to the Stars and Stripes newspaper that indicated the members of the 423rd ABG "blame themselves" for the sacking of Steele.

==== Move to RAF Fairford ====
In December 2022, the wing's new headquarters at RAF Fairford was unveiled during a ribbon cutting ceremony. The first elements are due to relocate there during the summer of 2023.

== Component units ==
As of December 2025, the 501st Combat Support Wing comprises the following units. Unless indicated otherwise, subordinate units are located at the same location as the unit they report to.

- Headquarters, 501st Combat Support Wing (RAF Fairford)
  - 422nd Air Base Group (RAF Croughton)
    - 420th Air Base Squadron
    - 420th Munitions Squadron (RAF Welford)
    - 422nd Civil Engineer Squadron (RAF Croughton)
    - 422nd Communications Squadron (RAF Croughton)
    - 422nd Force Support Squadron (RAF Croughton & Blenheim Crescent)
    - 422nd Medical Squadron (RAF Croughton)
    - 422nd Security Forces Squadron (RAF Croughton)
  - 423rd Air Base Group (RAF Alconbury)
    - 421st Air Base Squadron (RAF Menwith Hill)
    - 423rd Civil Engineer Squadron
    - 423rd Communications Squadron (RAF Alconbury and RAF Molesworth)
    - 423rd Force Support Squadron
    - 423rd Medical Squadron
    - 423rd Security Forces Squadron
    - 426th Air Base Squadron (Jåttå Military Compound, Stavanger, Norway)

== Lineage ==
501st Bombardment Group

- Established as the 501st Bombardment Group, Very Heavy on 25 May 1944

Activated on 1 June 1944
Inactivated on 10 June 1946

- Consolidated with the 701st Tactical Missile Wing as the 501st Tactical Missile Wing on 11 January 1982

501st Combat Support Wing

- Established as the 701st Tactical Missile Wing on 3 August 1956

Activated on 15 September 1956
Inactivated on 18 June 1958

- Redesignated 501st Tactical Missile Wing and consolidated with the 501st Bombardment Group on 11 January 1982

Activated on 1 July 1982
Inactivated on 31 May 1991

- Redesignated 501st Combat Support Wing on 22 March 2005

Activated on 12 May 2005

=== Assignments ===
- Second Air Force, 1 June 1944
- XXI Bomber Command, 14 Apr 1945 (attached to 315th Bombardment Wing after 15 April 1945)
- 315th Bombardment Wing (later 315th Composite Wing), 19 June 1945
- Twentieth Air Force, 15 May–10 June 1946
- Twelfth Air Force, 15 Sep 1956
- United States Air Forces in Europe, 1 January–18 June 1958
- Third Air Force, 1 July 1982 – 31 May 1991
- Third Air Force, 12 May 2005
- United States Air Forces in Europe, 1 November 2005
- Air Command Europe, 18 November 2005
- Third Air Force (Air Forces Europe), 1 Dec 2006 – present

=== Components ===
Groups

- 422d Air Base Group, 12 May 2005 – present
- 423rd Air Base Group, 12 May 2005 – present
- 501st Combat Support Group, 1 October 1982 – 31 May 1991
- 501st Security Police Group, 22 November 1983 – 8 April 1988
- 585th Tactical Missile Group (Bitburg Air Base, Germany), 15 September 1956 – 18 June 1958
- 586th Tactical Missile Group, 15 September 1956 – 18 June 1958
- 587th Tactical Missile Group (Sembach Air Base, Germany), 15 September 1956 – 18 June 1958

Squadrons

- 11th Tactical Missile Squadron, 1 October 1982 – 31 May 1991
- 21st Bombardment Squadron, 1 June 1944 – 10 June 1946 (not operational after c. 21 May 1946)
- 41st Bombardment Squadron, 1 June 1944 – 10 June 1946 (not operational after c. 21 May 1946)
- 485th Bombardment Squadron, 1 June 1944 – 10 June 1946 (not operational after c. 21 May 1946)
- 501st Comptroller Squadron, c. 1987 – 31 May 1991
- 501st Tactical Missile Maintenance Squadron, 1 October 1982 – 31 May 1991

=== Stations ===
- Dalhart Army Air Field, Texas, 1 June 1944
- Harvard Army Air Field, Nebraska, 22 Aug 1944
- Fort Lawton, Washington, 10–17 March 1945
- Hawaii, 25–30 March 1945
- Northwest Field, Guam, 14 April 1945 – 10 June 1946
- Hahn Air Base, Germany, 15 September 1956 – 18 June 1958
- RAF Greenham Common, England, 1 July 1982 – 31 May 1991
- RAF Mildenhall, England, 12 May 2005
- RAF Alconbury, England, 30 Sep 2007 – 16 Jul 2023
- RAF Fairford, England, 17 Jul 2023 - present

== Commanders ==
- Capt Harry L. Young, 27 Jun 1944
- Lt Col Arch G. Campbell Jr., 6 Jul 1944
- Col Boyd Hubbard Jr., 11 Aug 1944
- Col Vincent M. Miles Jr., 15 Apr – 20 May 1946
- Not manned, 21 May – 10 Jun 1946
- Lt Col Robert F. Zachmann 15 Sep 1956
- Col Theodore H. Runyon 7 Jan 1957 – 18 Jun 1958
- Col Robert M. Thompson, 1 Jul 1982
- Col John Bacs, 25 Jan 1985
- Col William E. Jones, 2 June 1987
- Col Richard P. Riddick, 21 Jul 1988
- Col Wendell S. Brande, 7 Jan – 31 May 1991
- Col Blake F. Lindner, 12 May 2005
- Col Kimberly K. Toney, 21 Jun 2007
- Col Brian A. Filler, 7 Jul 2021
- Col D. Landon Phillips, 17 Jul 2023
- Col Michael J. Jewell, 25 Jul 2025

== Unit Decorations and Honors ==
- Distinguished Unit Citation (Japan) 6 – 13 Jul 1945
- Asiatic-Pacific Campaign Streamers: Air Offensive, Japan Eastern Mandates, Western Pacific
- Air Force Outstanding Unit Award: 15 Sep 1956 – 30 Apr 1958, 1 Jul 1982 – 30 Jun 1984, 1 Jul 1987 – 31 May 1989, 1 Jun 1989 – 31 May 1991

== See also ==
- List of wings of the United States Air Force
- United States Air Force in the United Kingdom
