= 485th =

485th may refer to:

- 485th Aero Construction Squadron, part of the 27th Special Operations Wing at Cannon Air Force Base, New Mexico
- 485th Air Expeditionary Wing, provisional United States Air Force unit assigned to the Air Combat Command
- 485th Bombardment Squadron, inactive United States Air Force unit
- 485th Fighter Squadron, inactive United States Air Force unit
- 485th Intelligence Squadron (485 IS) is an intelligence unit located at Mainz-Kastel, Germany

== See also ==
- 485 (number)
- 485, the year 485 (CDLXXXV) of the Julian calendar
- 485 BC
