= 485th Bombardment Squadron =

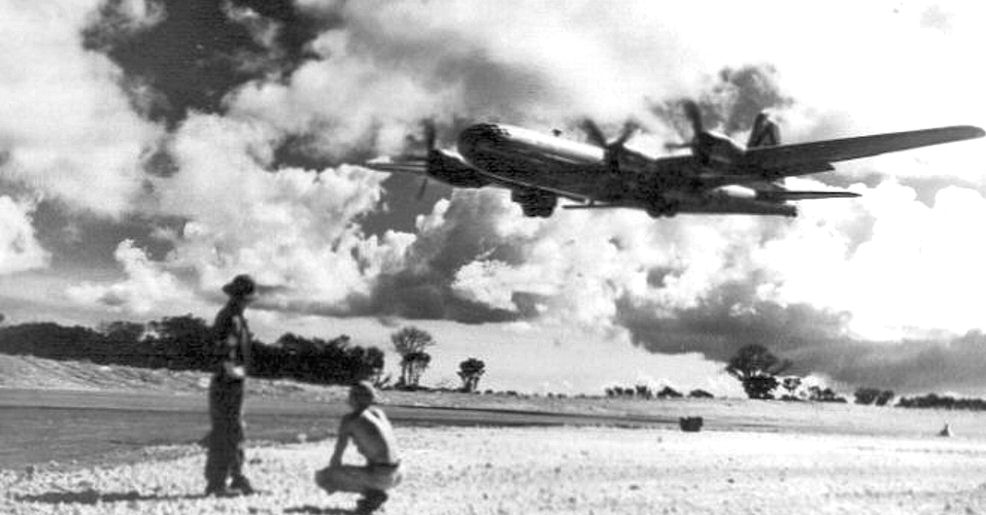
- 501st Bombardment Group B-29 taking off from Northwest Field, Guam in 1945
- Active: 1917–1919; 1925–1937; 1944; 1944–1946
- Country: United States
- Branch: United States Air Force
- Type: Heavy bomber
- Engagements: World War I Pacific Theater
- Decorations: Distinguished Unit Citation

Insignia
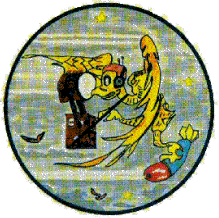
- 485th Bombardment Squadron emblem (Note: Approved 26 June 1945. Description: On a grayed dark blue green disc, flecked with gray clouds in base and three, yellow, five-point stars at chief, sinister fess, and base points, within a black border, a caricatured vari-colored bird in reverse flight wearing a radio headset and peering into a radar 'scope while adjusting dials on set with right foot, and holding a red, blue and yellow aerial bomb in the claws of the left foot, all emitting speed lines toward dexter.)

The 485th Bombardment Squadron is an inactive United States Air Force unit. It was last assigned to the 501st Bombardment Group at Northwest Field, Guam, where it was inactivated on 10 June 1946.

The squadron's first predecessor was organized as the 73rd Aero Squadron. After training in the United States, it moved to France in the spring of 1918. It was renumbered as the 485th Aero Squadron in February 1918. It remained in France following the Armistice until returning to the United States in May 1919 for demobilization.

The squadron's second predecessor was formed in the Organized Reserves in 1925 as the 485th Bombardment Squadron. These two units were consolidated in 1936. Along with all other Organized Reserve units, the squadron was disbanded in May 1942.

The third squadron, and the second to be named the 485th Bombardment Squadron, was organized in March 1944 as a Boeing B-29 Superfortress unit, but was soon inactivated as the Army Air Forces reorganized its very heavy bomber units. It was activated again in June. After training in the United States, it deployed to Guam, where it participated in the strategic bombing campaign against Japan. It was awarded a Distinguished Unit Citation for its combat operations. Following V-J Day, the squadron remained in the Pacific until inactivating in 1946.

== History ==
=== World War I ===
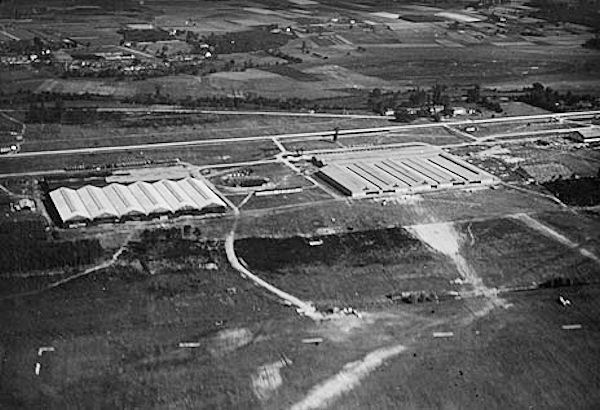
Romorantin Airdrome

The first predecessor of the squadron was organized in August 1917 at Kelly Field, Texas as the 73rd Aero Squadron. It trained at Kelly for the remainder of the year before moving to Camp Morrison, Virginia to prepare for shipment overseas, although it was not until March 1918 before the squadron finally shipped out. Upon arrival at Camp Morrison, the squadron assisted in completing the construction of the facilities there. While at Camp Morrison, the squadron was renumbered as the 485th Aero Squadron. (Note: The Air Service formed a second 73rd Aero Squadron (Service) the same month. Maurer, Combat Squadrons, pp. 268-269.) The squadron embarked on the USS Madawaska from Newport News, Virginia on 4 March 1918.

The squadron landed at Saint-Nazaire, France on 21 March and set out for Romorantin, arriving on 25 March. A detachment was left behind at Saint-Nazaire until 3 April to complete construction on quarters for the post commander there. At Romarantin, the squadron was engaged in the construction of facilities for Air Service Production Center No. 2. From mid May to mid June, it operated from Gievres, building two large warehouses there. The squadron established a detachment at Chatenay-sur-Seine in early September before the squadron joined it to begin construction of the new post there.

After the Armistice, the squadron moved to Bordeaux in 1919 and remained there until returning to Mitchel Field, New York, where it was demobilized in May 1919.

=== Organized Reserves ===
The 485th Bombardment Squadron was constituted in the fall of 1924 as an Organized Reserves unit and assigned to the Fifth Corps Area as part of the 348th Bombardment Group. It was not until September 1925, however, that personnel were assigned to the unit, located at Dayton, Ohio. Moreover, the 348th Group's headquarters at Springfield, Ohio was not manned until December 1933. Because the 485th was located near both Wilbur Wright Field and Patterson Field, its members were authorized to train with planes assigned to the regular army at those locations. Members of reserve units during this time usually performed their training as individuals attached to other units, rather than as a unit.

On 5 December 1936, the squadron was consolidated with the 485th Aero Squadron. However, a few months later, in June 1937, it became inactive when its personnel were withdrawn. The squadron, along with other existing Air Corps reserve units, was disbanded on 31 May 1942, shortly after the United States entered World War II.

=== World War II ===
The 485th Bombardment Squadron was activated on 11 March 1944 at Dalhart Army Air Field, Texas as one of the four original squadrons of the 505th Bombardment Group, moving the following day with the group's other bombardment squadrons to Harvard Army Air Field, Nebraska. At Harvard the 505th's squadrons began to equip with Boeing B-17 Flying Fortresses for training due to the lack of Boeing B-29 Superfortresses. In late April, it was consolidated with the reserve 485th Bombardment Squadron. Starting in April 1944, however, B-29 groups reorganized from four squadrons of 7 airplanes into three squadrons of 10 planes each. As a result of this reorganization, the 485th was inactivated.

The squadron was activated at Dalhart a second time on 1 June 1944. This time it was assigned to the 501st Bombardment Group. In August, the 501st Group and its squadrons moved to Harvard Army Air Field, Nebraska and began to equip with Superfortresses. The squadron completed its training and departed for the Pacific on 7 March 1945.

The squadron was equipped with the Bell Aircraft manufactured B-29B, which was designed to save weight by removing all of the guns and sighting equipment used on other B-29s, except the tail gun, allowing the B-29B to fly a little higher and a little further. The B-29B also had two new radar units installed, the AN/APQ-7 Eagle radar for bombing and navigation and the AN/APG-15 for aiming the tail gun. These two radar units gave the B-29B a distinctive shape as the APQ-7 antenna appeared as a small wing under the fuselage, between the two bomb bay doors and the APG-15 added a ball shaped antenna to the tail of the aircraft below the tail guns.

The squadron arrived at its combat station, Northwest Field on Guam on 14 April 1945. The squadron flew its first combat mission on 19 June 1945, attacking Japanese fortifications on Truk. Later that month, on 26 June, it flew its first mission attacking a target in Japan. For the remainder of the war, it operated principally against the enemy's petroleum industry on Honshu. These attacks included missions against the Maruzen oil refinery at Shimotso, the Utsobo oil refinery at Yokkaichi and the petroleum center at Kawasaki during the week beginning on 6 July 1945. For its performance on these missions, the squadron was awarded the Distinguished Unit Citation.

Following V-J Day, the squadron dropped supplies to Allied prisoners of war in Japan, Korea, Manchuria and China. It remained at Northwest Field until May 1946, when it became non-operational, and was inactivated there on 10 June 1946.

=== Lineage ===
485th Aero Squadron

- Organized as the 73d Aero Squadron on 14 August 1917

Redesignated 73d Aero Squadron (Construction) c. 20 August 1917
Redesignated 485th Aero Squadron (Construction) on 1 February 1918
Demobilized on 20 May 1919

- Reconstituted and consolidated with the 485th Bombardment Squadron on 5 December 1936

485th Bombardment Squadron (Organized Reserves)

- Constituted as the 485th Bombardment Squadron on 31 March 1924 and allotted to the Organized Reserves

Activated September 1925 (personnel assigned)
Consolidated with the 485th Aero Squadron on 5 December 1936
Inactivated June 1937 (personnel withdrawn)
Disbanded on 31 May 1942

- Reconstituted and consolidated with the 485th Bombardment Squadron, Very Heavy on 21 April 1944

485th Bombardment Squadron, Very Heavy

- Constituted as the 485th Bombardment Squadron, Very Heavy on 28 February 1944

Activated on 11 March 1944.

- Consolidated with the 485th Bombardment Squadron on 21 April 1944

Inactivated on 10 May 1944

- Activated on 1 June 1944

Inactivated on 10 June 1946

=== Assignments ===
- Unknown, 14 August 1917 – March 1918 (Note: Probably Post Headquarters, Kelly Field until 21 December 1917, then Aeronautical Supply Depot and Concentration Camp.)
- Air Service Production Center No. 2, c. 25 March 1918
- Air Service Spares Depot, c. 21 September 1918 – January 1919
- Unknown, January–20 May 1919 (Note: Probably Aviation General Supply Depot.)
- 348th Bombardment Group, c. September 1925
- Fifth Corps Area, June 1937 – 31 May 1942
- 505th Bombardment Group, 11 March–10 May 1944
- 501st Bombardment Group, 1 June 1944 – 10 June 1946

=== Stations ===
- Kelly Field, Texas, 14 August 1917 – 15 December 1917
- Camp Morrison, Virginia, 21 December 1917 – 4 March 1918
- Romorantin, France, 25 March 1918 (Operated from Gievres, 17 May–9 June 1918, detachments at Saint-Nazaire until 3 April 1918 and at Chatenay-sur-Seine after 11 September 1918)
- Chatenay-sur-Seine, France, 21 September 1918
- Bordeaux, France, c. 1 Feb 1919-1919
- Mitchel Field, New York, c. 2–20 May 1919
- Dayton, Ohio c. September 1925 – June 1937
- Dalhart Army Air Field, Texas, 11 March 1944
- Harvard Army Air Field, Nebraska, 12 March–10 May 1944
- Dalhart Army Air Field, Texas, 1 June 1944
- Harvard Army Air Field, Nebraska, 23 August 1944 – 7 March 1945
- Northwest Field, Guam, 14 April 1945 – 10 June 1946

=== Aircraft ===
- Boeing B-17 Flying Fortress, 1944
- Boeing B-29 Superfortress, 1944–1946

=== Awards and campaigns ===
Award streamer	Award	Dates	Notes
	Distinguished Unit Citation	6 July–13 July 1945	Japan, 485th Bombardment Squadron

Campaign Streamer	Campaign	Dates	Notes
	Theater of Operations	c. 25 March 1918–1919	485th Aero Squadron
	Air Offensive, Japan	14 April 1945–2 September 1945	485th Bombardment Squadron
	Eastern Mandates	14 April 1945–14 April 1944	485th Bombardment Squadron
	Western Pacific	17 April 1945–2 September 1945	485th Bombardment Squadron
