= 484th =

484th may refer to:

- 484th Aero Construction Squadron, part of the 53d Wing at Eglin Air Force Base, Florida
- 484th Air Expeditionary Wing, provisional United States Air Force unit assigned to the United States Air Force Air Combat Command
- 484th Bombardment Squadron, inactive United States Air Force unit
- 484th Fighter-Interceptor Squadron, inactive United States Air Force unit

== See also ==
- 484 (number)
- 484, the year 484 (CDLXXXIV) of the Julian calendar
- 484 BC
