= 315th Air Division =

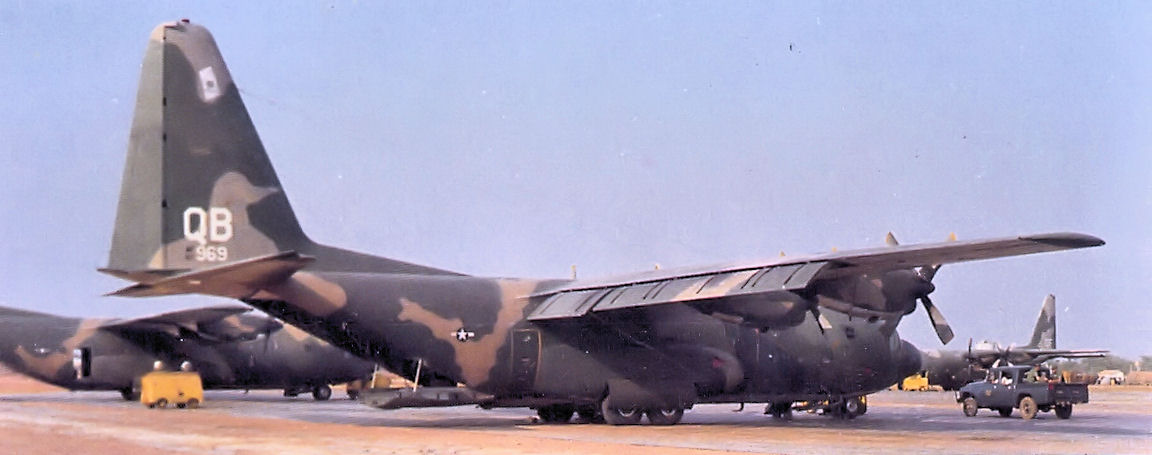
- Division C-130 Hercules deployed to Cam Ranh AB, Vietnam (Note: Aircraft is Lockheed C-130B-LM Hercules, serial 61-0969 of the 29th Tactical Airlift Squadron, 463d Tactical Airlift Wing in July 1969. This plane was sent to the Aerospace Maintenance and Regeneration Center on 30 June 1993. It was later transferred to the Argentine Air Force. Baugher, Joe (25 July 2023). "1961 USAF Serial Numbers". Joe Baugher.)
- Active: 1944–1950; 1951–1969
- Country: United States
- Branch: United States Air Force
- Role: Command of airlift forces
- Engagements: Pacific Theater of Operations; Korean War
- Decorations: Air Force Outstanding Unit Award; Republic of Korea Presidential Unit Citation

Commanders
- Notable commanders: Frank A. Armstrong

Insignia
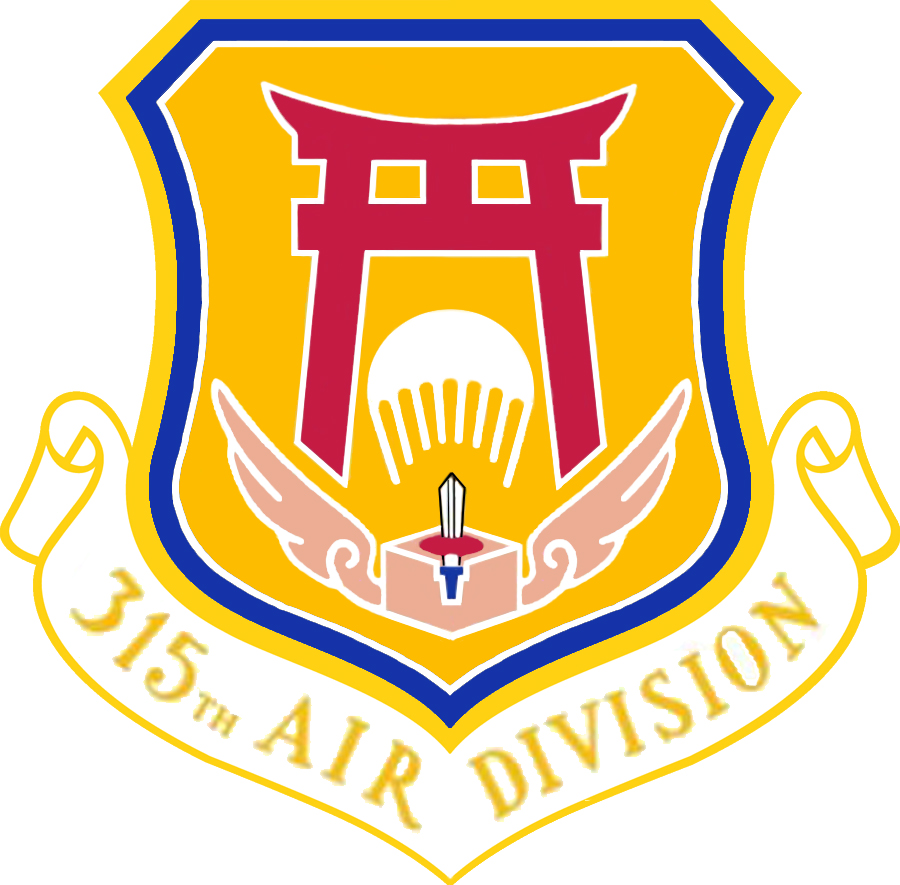
- 315th Air Division emblem (Note: Approved 11 October 1954. Description: Or, within and beneath a torii gate gules a representation of a parachute argent lowering a winged cargo box in perspective, one edge to front, light brown, its top bearing overall a two edged sword of the third [color mentioned], hilt azure, all outlined white, surmounted by a cross of the second [color mentioned], all within a diminished bordure of the fifth [color mentioned], fimbriated and outlined of the third.)

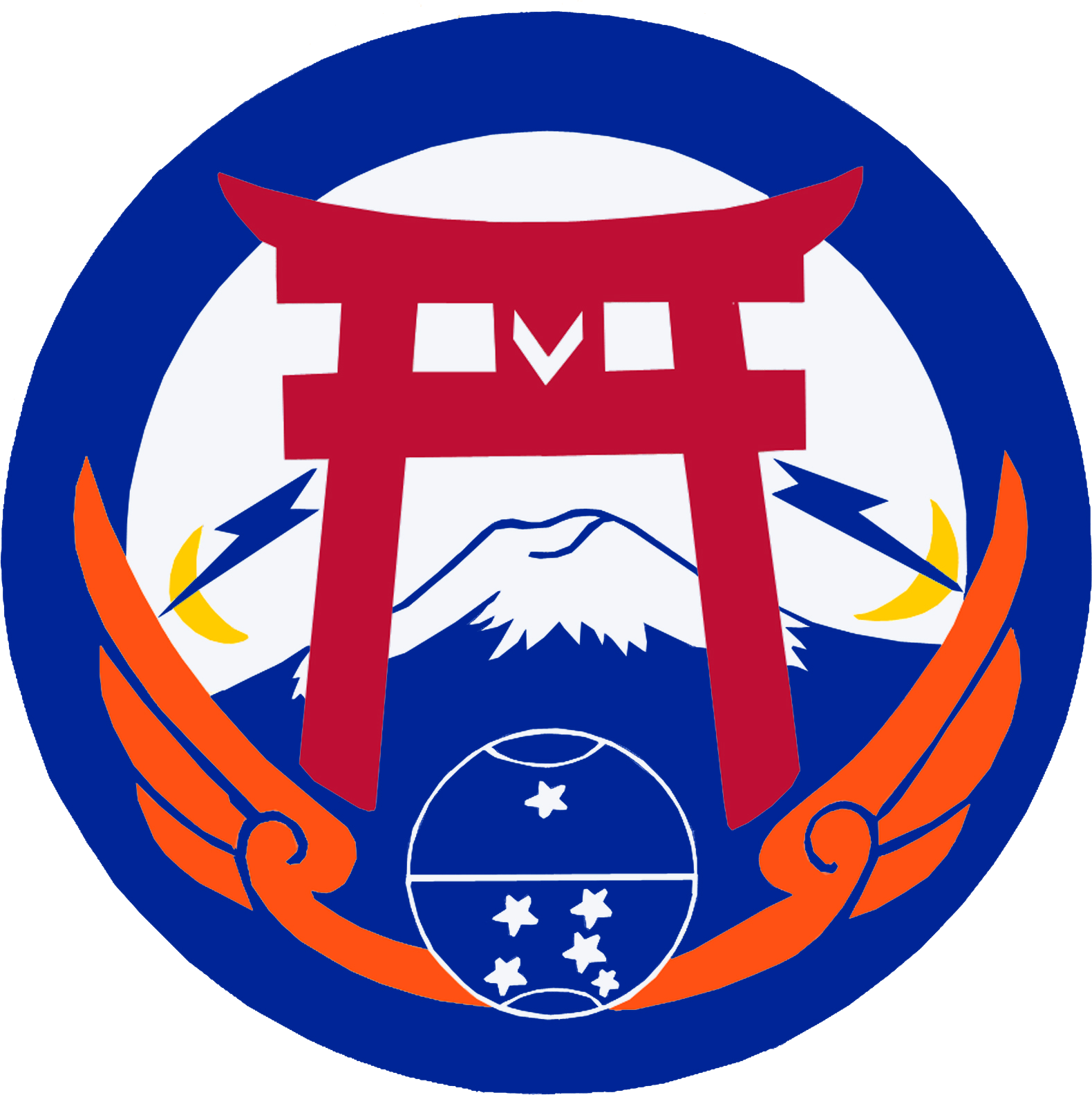
- 315th Bombardment Wing emblem (Note: Approved 25 April 1947. Description: On a white disc charged in base with a medium blue representation of Mt. Fujiyama [sic] between a jagged lightning flash in dexter fesse and a like flash in sinister fesse of the last [color mentioned], each passing through a yellow, quarter moon, all within a border of the second [color mentioned] and surmounted by a large, dark red Torii pierced at center with a chevron couped inverted, above a sphere of the second [color mentioned], outlined, charged, and marked with the Southern Cross constellation of the first [color mentioned], at the center of a stylized pair of golden wings in base.)

The 315th Air Division is an inactive United States Air Force formation. Originally designated the 315th Bombardment Wing, it was activated in July 1944 at Peterson Field, Colorado as a command organization for four very heavy Boeing B-29 Superfortress bombardment groups. It supervised the 16th, 331st, 501st and 502nd Bombardment Groups in the Mariana Islands during the last stages of the Second World War. Its last assignment was with Pacific Air Forces, based at Tachikawa Air Base, Japan, where the division was inactivated in April 1969.

== History ==
=== World War II ===
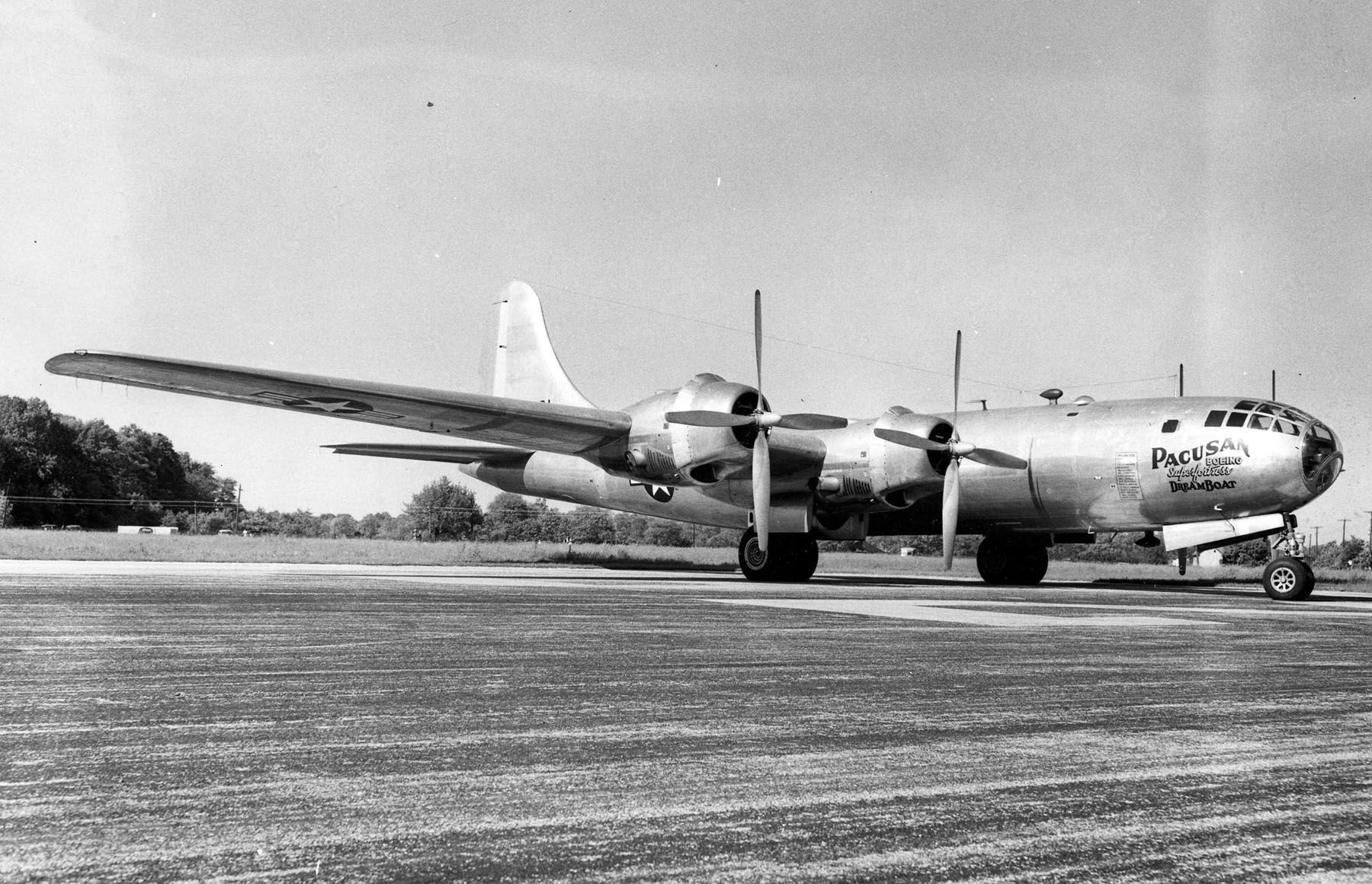
B-29B Superfortress Pacusan Dreamboat (Note: Aircraft is Bell Aircraft built Boeing B-29B-60-BA Superfortress, serial 44-84061 Pacusan Dreamboat. Later modified as B-29J. In 1946, he plane flew nonstop from Honolulu, Hawaii to Cairo, Egypt in 39 hours. It was modified for photographic reconnaissance as FB-29J, then as a trainer as TB-29B. It was reclaimed at Tinker Air Force Base, Oklahoma on 8 August 1954. Baugher, Joe (4 June 2023). "1944 USAF Serial Numbers". Joe Baugher.)

The 315th Bombardment Wing was activated in July 1944 at Peterson Field, Colorado as a command organization for four very heavy Boeing B-29 Superfortress bombardment groups. The wing trained in Colorado while subordinate groups were trained in Kansas by the Second Air Force.

When training was completed, the wing headquarters moved to Guam in the Mariana Islands of the Central Pacific Area in late March 1945. The 315th was the fifth and last B-29 wing assigned to XXI Bomber Command. Most of the Wing's groups and squadrons flew the B-29B aircraft. The limited-production B-29B was designed to save weight by removing all of the guns and sighting equipment used on other B-29s, except the tail gun. The weight savings allowed the B-29B to fly a little higher and a little further. The B-29B aircraft also had two new radar units installed. One was the AN/APQ-7 Eagle radar for bombing and navigation and the other was the AN/APG-15 used for aiming the tail gun. These two radar units gave the B-29B a distinctive shape as the APQ-7 antenna appeared as a small wing under the fuselage, between the two bomb bay doors and the APG-15 added a ball shaped antenna to the tail of the aircraft below the tail guns.

In the Marianas, the Wing commanded the 16th, 331st, 501st and 502nd Bombardment Groups. The 16th and the 501st were the first to arrive in mid April; the 331st and 502d arrived in mid-May 1945.

Its groups flew "shakedown" missions against Japanese targets on Moen Island, Truk, and other points in the Carolines and Marianas. The 16th and 501st began combat missions over Japan on 26 June with attacks on the Utsube Oil Refinery in Yokkaichi. The 315th and 502d did not engage in combat until 1 August with attacks on the Mitsubishi Havana Oil Refinery in Kawasaki. For all four groups, oil industry targets in Japan were its primary targets.

The wing flew its last combat missions on 14 August when hostilities ended targeting the oil refineries at Akita. Afterwards, the wing's B 29s carried relief supplies to Allied prisoner of war camps in Japan and Manchuria. Due to their late arrival in the theater, the groups did not return to the United States until April/May 1946.

The Wing then moved to Ashiya Army Air Base, Japan at the end of May 1946 to become part of the Fifth Air Force occupation forces. It was redesignated as the 315th Composite Wing in January 1946 and controlled a mixture of fighter and bomber units performing occupation duty and provided air defense over Japan during the occupation era. The division was relieved of occupation duty and inactivated in March 1950

=== Korean War ===
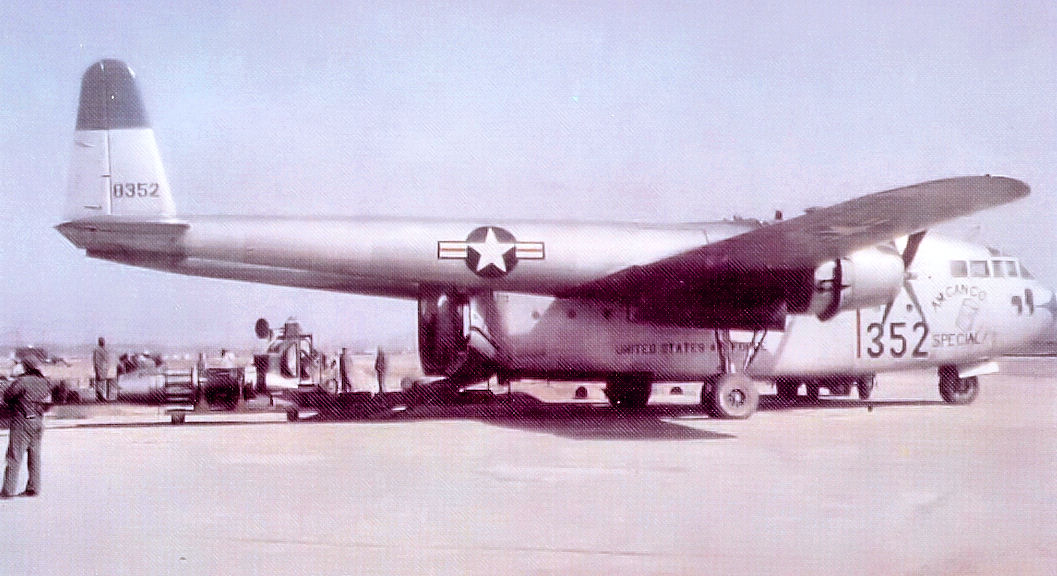
314th Troop Carrier Group C-119B Flying Boxcar operating from a base in South Korea, 1953.

With the outbreak of the Korean War, the division was again activated in January 1951 and reassigned to Far East Air Forces. It was re-designated as the 315th Air Division (Combat Cargo) and took over the resources of the Far East Air Forces Combat Cargo Command (Provisional), which was set up in June 1950 in the immediate aftermath of the North Korean invasion of the south.

It assumed command and control of the following units:

- 437th Troop Carrier Wing (C-46 Commando)
- 374th Troop Carrier Wing (C-46 Commando, C-47 Skytrain, C-54 Skymaster)
- 61st Troop Carrier Group (C-54 Skymaster)
- 314th Troop Carrier Group (C-119 Flying Boxcar)

During the Korean War, its components evacuated wounded from Korea, airdropped supplies and personnel, hauled emergency supplies, materiel, replacement troops, mail, rations and ammunition, participated in joint training exercises in Japan, took part in numerous combat missions, and operated regular transport schedules within the Far East area.

=== Cold War ===
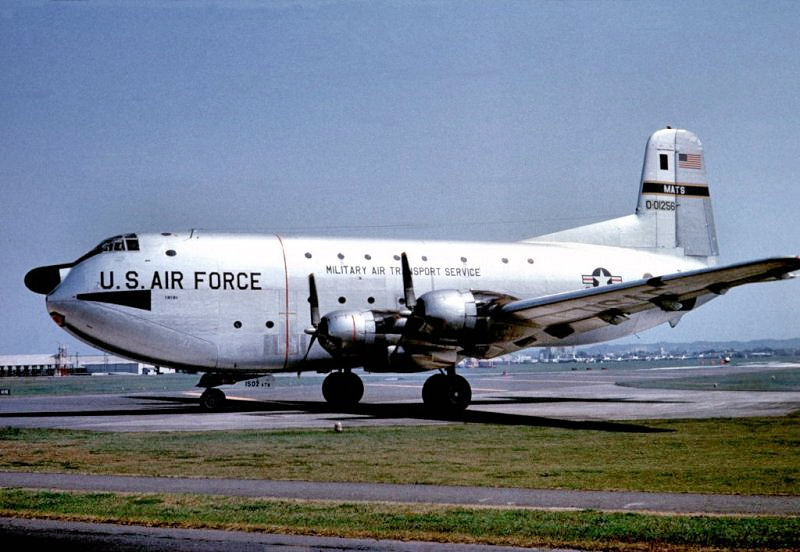
374th Troop Carrier Wing C-124A Globemaster II

Before combat operations ceased in Korea, the division began supporting French forces engaged in a war in Indochina. From May 1953 – July 1954, it provided Fairchild C-119 Flying Boxcars to the French, trained French air crews and maintenance personnel, performed additional airlift missions in support of the French, and finally evacuated 509 wounded French troops from Indochina during Operation Wounded Warrior in June-July 1954. "The 14,000-mile airlift carrying the French soldiers followed an eastern route due to political considerations."

In July 1954, the 315th resumed normal airlift operations in the Western Pacific Area and participated in training exercises in Japan. It continued peacetime readiness operations throughout the 1950s and early 1960s from its base at Ashiya. In 1962, it established airlift support for the expanding conflict in Southeast Asia. Meantime, the division continued its routine airlift in the Far East, flew humanitarian missions, and participated in training exercises when possible.

The crisis prompted by the North Korean seizure of the USS Pueblo in January 1968, found the 315th supporting an emergency airlift to the Republic of Korea.

The 315th AD was inactivated in April 1969 due to budget reductions. Its operational units (the 314th, 374th and 463d Tactical Airlift Wings) were reassigned.

== Lineage ==
315th Air Division

- Established as the 315th Bombardment Wing, Very Heavy on 7 June 1944

Activated on 17 July 1944
Redesignated 315th Composite Wing on 8 January 1946
Inactivated on 20 August 1948
Redesignated 315th Air Division (Combat Cargo) on 10 January 1951
Activated on 25 January 1951
Redesignated 315th Air Division on 1 August 1967
Inactivated on 15 April 1969

- Consolidated with the Table of Distribution 315th Air Division on 1 July 1978 (remained inactive)

Table of Distribution 315th Air Division

- Established as the 315th Air Division on 13 August 1948

Organized on 18 August 1948
Discontinued 1 March 1950
Inactivated 15 April 1969

- Consolidated with the 315th Air Division on 1 July 1978

=== Assignments ===
- Second Air Force, 17 July 1944 (attached to XXII Bomber Command), c. 14 August-c. 7 December 1944
- Twentieth Air Force, c. 25 March 1945
- XXI Bomber Command, 5 April 1945
- Twentieth Air Force, 16 July 1945
- Fifth Air Force, 30 May 1946
- V Fighter Command, 30 May 1946
- Fifth Air Force, 1 June 1946 – 1 March 1950
- Far East Air Forces (later Pacific Air Forces), 25 January 1951 – 15 April 1969

=== Components ===
==== World War II ====
- 16th Bombardment Group: 14 April 1945 – 15 April 1946
- 24th Air Service Group: 14 April 1945 – 15 April 1946
- 73d Air Service Group: 12 May 1945 – 15 April 1946
- 75th Air Service Group: 15 April 1945 – 15 May 1946
- 76th Air Service Group: 12 May 1945 – 15 April 1946
- 331st Bombardment Group: 12 May 1945 – 15 April 1946
- 501st Bombardment Group: 15 April 1945 – 15 May 1946
- 502d Bombardment Group: 12 May 1945 – 15 April 1946

==== United States Air Force ====
Wings

- 8th Fighter Wing (later 8th Fighter-Bomber Wing): 18 August 1948 – 1 March 1950
- 38th Bombardment Wing: 18 August 1948 – 1 April 1949
- 314th Tactical Airlift Wing: 22 January 1966 – 8 April 1969
- 315th Troop Carrier Wing: 10 June 1952 – 18 January 1955
- 347th Fighter Wing: 18 August 1948 – 1 March 1950
- 374th Troop Carrier Wing (later 374th Tactical Airlift Wing): 25 January 1951 – 1 July 1957, 8 August 1966 – 8 April 1969
- 403d Troop Carrier Wing: 14 April 1952 – 1 January 1953
- 437th Troop Carrier Wing: 25 January 1951 – 10 June 1952
- 475th Fighter Wing: 18–20 August 1948
- 483d Troop Carrier Wing: 1 January 1953 – 25 June 1960
- 463d Tactical Airlift Wing : 23 November 1965 – 8 April 1969

Groups

- 8th Fighter Group: 31 May 1946 – 18 August 1948
- 38th Bombardment Group: 31 May 1946 – 18 August 1948
- 61st Troop Carrier Group: attached 25 January 1951 – 21 November 1952
- 314th Troop Carrier Group: attached 25 January 1951 – 15 November 1954
- 315th Troop Carrier Group (later 315th Air Commando Group): 8 December 1962 – 8 March 1966 (detached entire period)
- 316th Troop Carrier Group: attached 15 November 1954 – 18 March 1955, assigned 18 March 1955 – 18 January 1957 (detached entire period)
- 347th Fighter Group: 25 September 1947 – 18 August 1948
- 6315th Operations Group: 20 October 1964 – 8 August 1966
- Combat Cargo (Troop Carrier) Group, Provisional, 6492d: attached 21 September-8 Dec 1962

Squadrons

- 21st Troop Carrier Squadron: 25 June 1960 – 8 August 1966 (detached entire period)
- 24th Helicopter Squadron: 13 October 1956 – 8 March 1960
- 25th Tactical Reconnaissance Squadron: 31 May 1946 – 28 February 1947, attached 28 February 1947 – 15 April 1948
- 29th Troop Carrier Squadron: 27 January-25 Mar 1966
- 35th Troop Carrier Squadron: 8 January 1963 – 8 August 1966 (detached entire period)
- 38th Tactical Airlift Squadron: attached 8 February-19 Jul 1968
- 41st Photographic Reconnaissance Squadron: 18 September 1945 – 4 January 1946
- 41st Troop Carrier Squadron: c. 21 November 1965 – 8 August 1966 (detached entire period)
- 50th Troop Carrier Squadron: attached 1 October 1951 – 15 November 1954; assigned 26 December 1965 – 23 February 1966
- 68th Fighter Squadron: attached 10 April-24 Nov 1947
- 345th Troop Carrier Squadron: 1 June 1962 – 8 January 1963; 27 November 1965 – 25 March 1966 (detached entire period)
- 346th Tactical Airlift Squadron: attached 7 January-25 Mar 1969
- 347th Tactical Airlift Squadron: attached 19 July-18 Oct 1968
- 348th Tactical Airlift Squadron: 18 October 1968 – 7 January 1969
- 421st Night Fighter Squadron: 31 May 1946 – 20 February 1947
- 433d Fighter Squadron: attached 15 October 1946 – 18 November 1947
- 776th Troop Carrier Squadron: 26 December 1965 – 25 March 1966
- 777th Tactical Airlift Squadron: attached 31 March-1 Aug 1968
- 778th Tactical Airlift Squadron: attached 1–23 August 1968
- 779th Tactical Airlift Squadron: attached 7 February-31 Mar 1968
- 815th Troop Carrier (later, 815th Tactical Airlift) Squadron: 25 June 1960 – 1 November 1968
- 817th Troop Carrier Squadron: 25 June 1960 – 8 August 1966 (detached entire period)
- 6461st Troop Carrier Squadron (later 6461st Air Transport Squadron): 1 December 1952 – 24 June 1955 (detached entire period)
- 6475th Flying Training Squadron: 25 November 1954 – 18 May 1955 (detached entire period)
- 6485th Operations Squadron: 17 September 1956 – 1 September 1968; attached 1 December 1968 – 8 April 1969

=== Stations ===
- Peterson Field, Colorado, 17 July 1944
- Fort Lawton, Washington, 10–17 March 1945
- Northwest Field, Guam, Mariana Islands, 5 April 1945
- Ashiya Army Air Base, Japan, 30 May 1946
- Itazuke Army Air Base (later Itazuke Airfield, Itazuke Air Base), Japan, 31 May 1946 – 1 March 1950.
- Ashiya Air Station, Japan, 25 January 1951
- Fuchu Air Station, Japan, 5 February 1951
- Tachikawa Air Base, Japan, 24 April 1954 – 15 April 1969

== See also ==
- List of United States Air Force air divisions
