= 505th Bombardment Group =

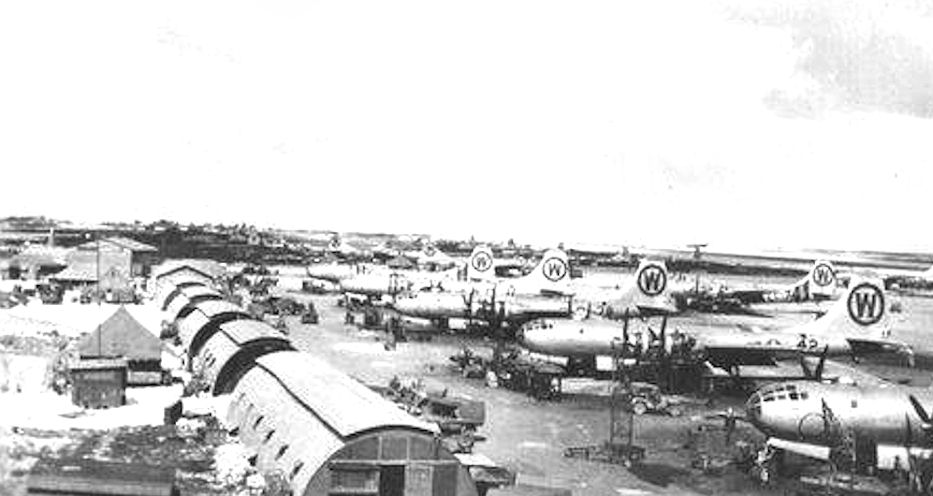
- Group B-29s at North Field, Tinian July 1945
- Active: 1944-1946
- Country: United States
- Branch: United States Air Force
- Role: Strategic bombardment
- Engagements: Pacific Ocean Theater
- Decorations: Distinguished Unit Citation

Insignia
- Tail marking: K above a triangle (January – March 1945)
- Tail marking: W within a circle (April – September 1945)

The 505th Bombardment Group is an inactive United States Air Force unit. Its last assignment was with Thirteenth Air Force, stationed at Clark Field, Philippines, where it was inactivated on 30 June 1946. After organizing and training in the United states, the group served in the Pacific Ocean theater of World War II as part of Twentieth Air Force. The group's Boeing B-29 Superfortress engaged in the strategic bombing campaign against Japan from January through August 1945, earning two Distinguished Unit Citations.

== History ==
=== Activation and training ===
The 505th Bombardment Group was activated at Dalhart Army Air Field, Texas in March 1944 as a Boeing B-29 Superfortress very heavy bombardment group, drawing its initial cadre from the 9th Bombardment Group. In moved to Harvard Army Air Field, Nebraska on 1 April, where the group began training with Boeing B-17 Flying Fortresses on 1 July until B-29s became available. On 1 May 1944, the group reorganized from four squadrons of 7 airplanes into three squadrons of 10 planes each. The group trained for combat with B-29s until leaving Harvard on 6 November 1944.

The group's ground echelon sailed from the Seattle Port of Embarkation for the Pacific on 14 November. The air echelon staged through Hamilton Field and Mather Field, California with its B-29s.

=== Combat Operations ===
The group arrived at its combat station, North Field, Tinian in the Mariana Islands on 19 December 1944. Three days later, it began flying training missions, including an attack on Moen Airfield in January. It flew its first combat mission on 24 January 1945 against targets on Iwo Jima and the Truk Islands. It began operations flying high altitude daylight missions, engaging in the strategic bombing campaign against Japan. On 10 February, it flew a strike on the Nakajima Aircraft Company factory at Ota, for which it was awarded a Distinguished Unit Citation (DUC). Eighteen group B-29s bombed the target, but eight were lost, most to operational problems. However, The results of high altitude B-29 raids on Japan were disappointing. From 19 January, no mission had been able to bomb visually, and radar bombing results were unsatisfactory. Low altitude night area attacks with incendiaries promised better results for XXI Bomber Command. The switch in tactics began with the launch of a raid against the port and urban area of Tokyo on 9 March 1945.

The group conducted area raids with incendiaries until August 1945. During April 1945, the group was diverted from the strategic campaign against Japan to support Operation Iceberg, the invasion of Okinawa. It struck Miyazaki Airfield and Kanoya Airfield, bases from which kamikaze attacks were being launched. These bases were located on Kyushu, only 300 miles from Okinawa. The attacks directly impacted kamikaze launches, but also forced the Japanese military to retain fighter aircraft to defend the Japanese Special Attack Units that otherwise might have been used to challenge air superiority over Okinawa. (Note: 75% of Twentieth Air Force's missions in April and May 1945 were flown to support Operation Iceberg. Cate & Olson p. 631.)

The group also conducted aerial mining operations against Japanese shipping. It was the only group in XXI Bomber Command to carry out these missions, which began on 27 March. On 17 June, it concentrated its efforts on the mining campaign. It received a second DUC for mining the Shimonoseki Strait and harbors in the Inland Sea between 17 June and 1 July 1945. The group flew its last mission on the night of 14 and 15 August 1945. Following V-J Day its B-29s carried relief supplies to Allied prisoner of war camps. It also flew show of force flights and conducted bomb damage assessment flights over Japan. It moved to Clark Field in the Philippines in March 1946, and was inactivated there on 15 June 1946.

== Lineage ==
- Constituted as the 505th Bombardment Group, Very Heavy on 28 February 1944

Activated on 11 March 1944
Inactivated on 30 June 1946

=== Assignments ===
- Second Air Force, 28 February – 6 November 1944 (attached to 17th Bombardment Operational Training Wing, after c. 15 April 1944)
- 313th Bombardment Wing, 19 December 1944
- Thirteenth Air Force, 6 December 1945 – 30 June 1946

=== Components ===
- 482d Bombardment Squadron: 11 March 1944 – 30 June 1946
- 483d Bombardment Squadron: 11 March 1944 – 30 June 1946
- 484th Bombardment Squadron: 11 March 1944 – 30 June 1946
- 485th Bombardment Squadron: 11 March – 10 May 1944

=== Stations ===
- Dalhart Army Air Field, Texas, 11 March 1944
- Harvard Army Air Field, Nebraska, 1 April – 6 November 1944
- North Field, Tinian, Mariana Islands, 19 December 1944 – 5 March 1946
- Clark Field, Luzon, Philippines, 14 March – 30 June 1946

=== Aircraft ===
- Boeing B-17 Flying Fortress, 1944
- Boeing B-29 Superfortress, 1944–1946

=== Awards and campaigns ===
Award streamer	Award	Dates	Notes
	Distinguished Unit Citation	10 February 1945	Ota, Japan
	Distinguished Unit Citation	17 June – 1 July 1945	Japan

Campaign Streamer	Campaign	Dates	Notes
	Air Offensive, Japan	24 December 1944 – 2 September 1945	
	Western Pacific	17 April 1945 – 2 September 1945	
	Eastern Mandates	7 December 1943 – 14 April 1944	(Note: Campaign credit awarded for combat operations in the area, although outside the official period of the campaign.)
