= 485 BC =

485 BC in various calendars
- Gregorian calendar: 485 BC; CDLXXXV BC
- Ab urbe condita: 269
- Ancient Egypt era: XXVII dynasty, 41
- Pharaoh: Xerxes I of Persia, 1
- Ancient Greek Olympiad (summer): 73rd Olympiad, year 4
- Assyrian calendar: 4266
- Balinese saka calendar: N/A
- Bengali calendar: −1078 – −1077
- Berber calendar: 466
- Buddhist calendar: 60
- Burmese calendar: −1122
- Byzantine calendar: 5024–5025
- Chinese calendar: 乙卯年 (Wood Rabbit); 2213 or 2006 — to — 丙辰年 (Fire Dragon); 2214 or 2007
- Coptic calendar: −768 – −767
- Discordian calendar: 682
- Ethiopian calendar: −492 – −491
- Hebrew calendar: 3276–3277
- Hindu calendars
- Vikram Samvat: −428 – −427
- Shaka Samvat: N/A
- Kali Yuga: 2616–2617
- Holocene calendar: 9516
- Iranian calendar: 1106 BP – 1105 BP
- Islamic calendar: 1140 BH – 1139 BH
- Javanese calendar: N/A
- Julian calendar: N/A
- Korean calendar: 1849
- Minguo calendar: 2396 before ROC 民前2396年
- Nanakshahi calendar: −1952
- Thai solar calendar: 58–59
- Tibetan calendar: ཤིང་མོ་ཡོས་ལོ་ (female Wood-Hare) −358 or −739 or −1511 — to — མེ་ཕོ་འབྲུག་ལོ་ (male Fire-Dragon) −357 or −738 or −1510

Year 485 BC was a year of the pre-Julian Roman calendar. At the time, it was known as the Year of the Consulship of Cornelius and Vibulanus (or, less frequently, year 269 Ab urbe condita). The denomination 485 BC for this year has been used since the early medieval period, when the Anno Domini calendar era became the prevalent method in Europe for naming years.

== Events ==
=== By place ===
==== Persian Empire ====
- Xerxes I is just beginning his reign after the death of his father Darius the Great in 486 BC. During this time the Persian empire extends as far west as Macedonia and Libya and as far east as the Hyphasis (Beas) River; it stretches to the Caucasus Mountains and the Aral Sea in the north and to the Persian Gulf and the Arabian Desert in the south.

==== Sicily ====
- Gelo, the tyrant of Gela, takes advantage of an appeal by the descendants of the first colonist of Syracuse, the Gamoroi, who had held power until they were expelled by the Killichiroi, the lower class of the city. He makes himself master of that city, leaving his brother Hieron to control Gela.

==== Roman Republic ====
- Three times Roman consul Spurius Cassius Vecellinus is tried, condemned and executed for high treason.
- The consul Quintus Fabius Vibulanus defeated the Volsci and Aequi in battle, but incurred the anger of the plebs by lodging the spoils of victory with the publicum.

== Births ==
- Herodotus, Greek historian, is estimated to be born this year.
- Some sources place the birth of Euripides in this year, though the more traditional date is 480.

== Deaths ==
- Spurius Cassius Vecellinus, three times Roman consul.
