= 484th Bombardment Squadron =

485th Bombardment Squadron
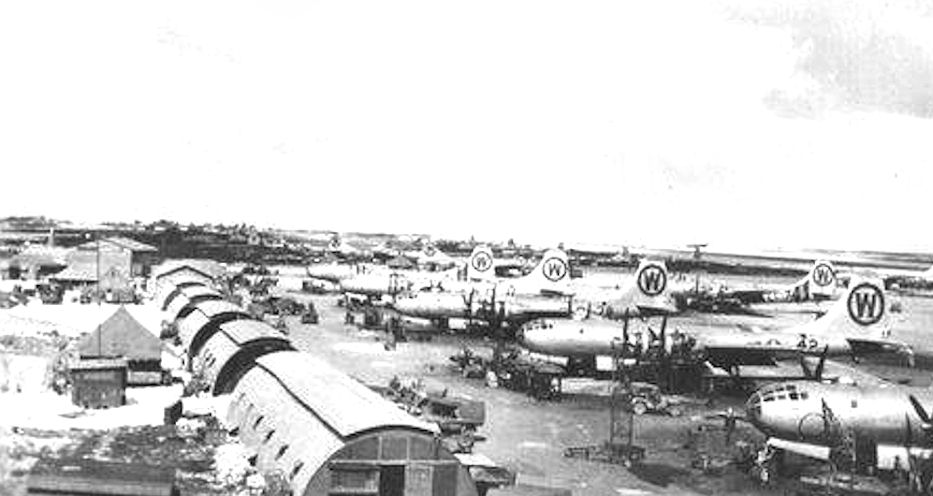
- 505th Bombardment Group B-29 Superfortresses at North Field Tinian July 1945
- Active: 1917–1919; 1929–1937; 1944–1946
- Country: United States
- Branch: United States Air Force
- Role: heavy bomber
- Part of: 505th Bombardment Group
- Engagements: Western Front (World War I); Air raids on Japan
- Decorations: Distinguished Unit Citation

The 484th Bombardment Squadron is an inactive United States Air Force unit. It was last assigned to the 505th Bombardment Group at Clark Field, Philippines, where it was inactivated on 10 June 1946.

The squadron's first predecessor was organized in August 1917 as the 72d Aero Squadron. In 1918, it was redesignated the 484th Aero Squadron (Construction) and deployed to France, where it constructed airfields in forward areas. Following the Armistice of 11 November 1918, the squadron returned to the United States for demobilization in 1919.

The squadron's second predecessor was the 484th Bombardment Squadron, which was formed in the Organized Reserves in 1924. The two squadrons were consolidated in 1936, but the consolidated unit was disbanded in 1942.

The 484th Bombardment Squadron, Very Heavy was organized in April 1944. Shortly after its activation it was consolidated with the disbanded reserve unit. After training in the United States, the squadron deployed to Tinian, where it participated in the strategic bombing campaign against Japan. It earned two Distinguished Unit Citations for attacks on Japan in 1945. Following V-J Day, the squadron moved to the Philippines, where it was inactivated.

== History ==
=== World War I ===
The 72d Aero Squadron was organized at Kelly Field, Texas on 15 August 1917. The squadron moved to Camp Morrison, Virginia, an aeronautical supply depot and concentration camp for units moving overseas in February 1918. Upon arrival, it was redesignated the 484th Aero Squadron (Construction). The squadron departed for France in early March, arriving at Vinets-sur-Aube, France, home of the 5th Air Depot, on the 26th. Beginning in April, the squadron constructed airfields and related facilities in the Zone of Advance of the Western Front. Following the Armistice of 11 November 1918, the squadron moved to Colombey-les-Belles Aerodrome, where the 1st Air Depot had been designated as the demobilization point for units serving in the Zone of Advance. The squadron moved to the port of Brest in December, and shipped back to the United States in January 1919. It was demobilized at East Potomac Park in Washington DC in February.

=== Organized Reserve ===
The 484th Bombardment Squadron was constituted in March 1924, allotted to the Organized Reserve and assigned to the Seventh Corps Area. (Note: Clay indicates the squadron was assigned to the Third Corps Area as part of the 347th Bombardment Group, but was not activated before the 347th was inactivated in October 1929. 347th headquarters was located in Baltimore, Maryland, within the Third Corps Area.) The squadron was organized by December 1929 at Oklahoma City, Oklahoma, within the Eighth Corps Area. The squadron's personnel conducted summer training at Hensley Field, Texas. In June 1936, the squadron was moved to Camden, New Jersey and allotted to Third Corps Area. In December, the squadron was consolidated with the World War I 484th Aero Squadron, but all personnel were withdrawn from the consolidated unit and it was inactivated in May 1937. The squadron was disbanded along with other Organized Reserve units at the end of May 1942.

=== World War II ===
The 484th Bombardment Squadron was activated in March 1944 at Dalhart Army Air Field, Texas as one of the four original squadrons of the 505th Bombardment Group. However, it moved the following day to Harvard Army Air Field, Nebraska, where it began training to become a Boeing B-29 Superfortress squadron. Because its complement of B-29s was not available, it initially trained with Boeing B-17 Flying Fortresses. In April 1944, the Army Air Forces directed the reorganization its Superfortress groups. One squadron in each group was eliminated, but the three remaining squadrons increased from seven to ten bombers each. This became effective for the 505th Group in May. The squadron completed its training and began deploying to the Pacific in November 1944.

The squadron arrived at its combat station, North Field (Tinian) just before Christmas 1944. The squadron flew its first combat mission in February 1945, striking targets in Iwo Jima and Truk. The squadron began flying missions in the strategic bombing campaign against Japan, participating in high altitude daylight raids against the Japanese Home Islands. It earned its first Distinguished Unit Citation (DUC) for a strike against the Nakajima Aircraft Company factory at Oka on 10 February 1945. However, the results of high altitude B-29 raids on Japan were disappointing. After a raid on 19 January, no mission had been able to bomb visually, and radar bombing results were unsatisfactory. Low altitude night area attacks with incendiaries promised better results, for XXI Bomber Command. The switch in tactics began with the launch of a raid against Tokyo on 9 March 1945. The squadron flew area firebombing attacks, flying at night and low altitude until the end of the war in August 1945.

During April and May 1945, the squadron was diverted from the strategic campaign against Japan to support Operation Iceberg, the invasion of Okinawa. It struck air bases from which kamikaze attacks were being launched. Many of these bases were located on Kyushu, only 300 miles from Okinawa. The attacks directly impacted kamikaze launches, but also forced the Japanese military to retain fighter aircraft to defend the Japanese Special Attack Units that otherwise might have been used to challenge air superiority over Okinawa. (Note: 75% of Twentieth Air Force's missions in April and May 1945 were flown to support Operation Iceberg. Cate & Olson p. 631.)

The squadron also conducted mining missions against Japanese shipping. It earned a second DUC for mining operations in the Shimonoseki Strait and harbors of the Seto Inland Sea during June and July 1945. After V-J Day, the squadron's B 29s dropped relief supplies to Allied prisoners of war held in camps in Japan and Manchuria; flew show of force missions and bomb damage assessment missions over Japan.

The squadron moved from Tinian to Clark Field in the Philippines in March 1946. It was inactivated at Clark on 15 June 1946.

== Lineage ==
484th Aero Squadron

- Organized as the 72d Aero Squadron on 15 August 1917

Redesignated 484th Aero Squadron (Construction) on 1 February 1918
Demobilized on 8 February 1919
Reconstituted and consolidated with the 484th Bombardment Squadron as the 484th Bombardment Squadron on 2 December 1936

484th Bombardment Squadron

- Constituted and allotted to the Organized Reserve on 31 March 1924

Activated by December 1929
Consolidated with the 484th Aero Squadron on 2 December 1936
Inactivated on 12 May 1937
Disbanded on 31 May 1942
Reconstituted and consolidated with the 484th Bombardment Squadron, Very Heavy as the 484th Bombardment Squadron, Very Heavy on 21 April 1944

484th Bombardment Squadron, Very Heavy

- Constituted on 28 February 1944

Activated on 11 March 1944
Consolidated with the 484th Bombardment Squadron, Very Heavy on 21 April 1944
Inactivated on 30 Jun 1946

=== Assignments ===
- Unknown, 15 August 1947 – March 1918 (Note: Probably assigned to Post Headquarters, Kelly Field and Headquarters, Camp Morrison Aeronautical Concentration Camp while in the United States.)
- Advance Section, Service of Supply, c. 26 March 1918
- United States First Army, 23 August 1918
- United States Second Army, 28 October – November 1918
- Unknown, c. 24 November 1918 – 8 February 1919 (Note: Probably assigned to 1st Air Depot until December 1918.)
- Seventh Corps Area, 31 March 1924 (347th Bombardment Group, 31 March 1924 – 2 August 1929 in inactive status)
- Eighth Corps Area, by December 1929
- Third Corps Area, 5 June 1936 – 12 May 1937
- 505th Bombardment Group, 11 March 1944 – 30 Jun 1946

=== Stations ===
- Kelly Field, Texas, 15 August 1947
- Camp Morrison, Virginia, 1 February – 4 March 1918
- Vinets-sur-Aube, France, 26 March 1918
- Longeaux, France, 15 July 1918
- Lay-Saint-Remy, France, c. 26 August 1918 (operated from Noviant-aux-Prés and Grosrouvres after 14 September 1918, detachments operated from several points in the Toul and Verdun sectors, 1–11 September 1918)
- Saizerais, France, c. 10 October 1918 (operated from Noviant-aux-Prés and Grosrouvres until 13 October 1918, detachments operated from Toul and Manonville, c. 5–c. 21 November 1918)
- Colombey-les-Belles Aerodrome, France, 24 November 1918
- Brest, France, 16 December 1918 – 2 January 1919
- Washington, DC, 1919 – 8 February 1919
- Oklahoma City, Oklahoma, by December 1929
- Camden, New Jersey, 5 June 1936 – 12 May 1937
- Dalhart Army Air Field, Texas, 11 March 1944
- Harvard Army Air Field, Nebraska, 12 March – 6 November 1944
- North Field Tinian, 24 December 1944 – 5 March 1946
- Clark Field, Luzon, Philippines, 14 March – 30 June 1946

=== Aircraft ===
- Boeing B-17 Flying Fortress, 1944
- Boeing B-29 Superfortress, 1944–1946

=== Awards and campaigns ===
Award streamer	Award	Dates	Notes
	Distinguished Unit Citation	10 February 1945	Oka, Japan, 484th Bombardment Squadron
	Distinguished Unit Citation	17 June – 1 July 1945	Japan, 484th Bombardment Squadron

Campaign Streamer	Campaign	Dates	Notes
	St Mihiel	12 September 1918 – 16 September 1918	484th Aero Squadron
	Air Offensive, Japan	24 December 1944 – 2 September 1945	484th Bombardment Squadron
	Eastern Mandates	24 December 1944 – 14 April 1944	484th Bombardment Squadron
	Western Pacific	17 April 1945 – 2 September 1945	484th Bombardment Squadron
