= Cosmo Oil Company =

Japanese petrochemical company

Cosmo Oil Co., Ltd.

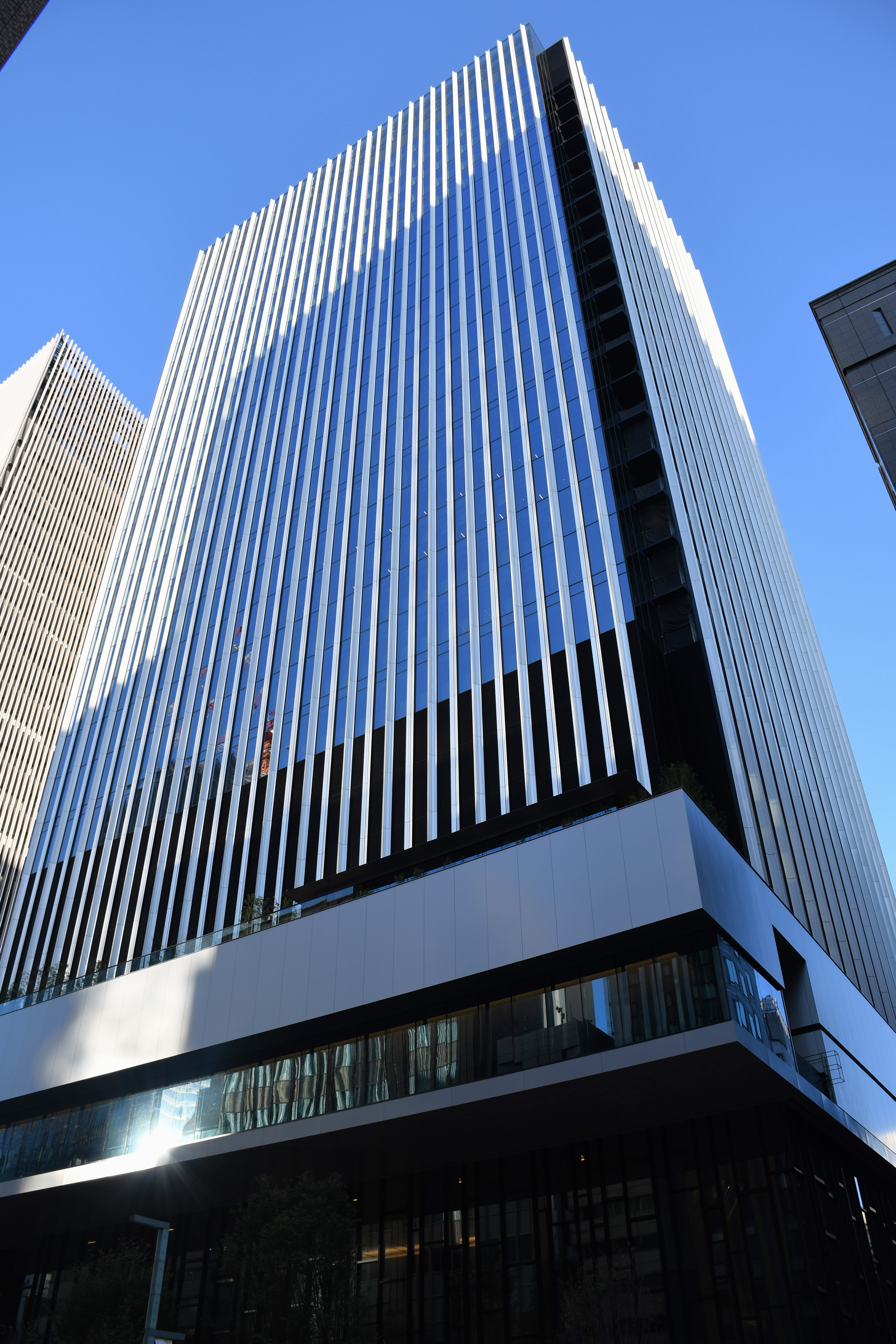
- Headquarters in Chūō, Tokyo
- Native name: コスモ石油株式会社
- Romanized name: Kosumo Sekiyu kabushiki gaisha
- Type: Subsidiary KK
- Traded as: TYO: 5007
- Industry: Oil and gas
- Predecessor: Maruzen Petrochemical; Cosmo Oil (original)
- Founded: September 4, 1939; 87 years ago (company); April 1, 1986; 40 years ago (brand)
- Headquarters: Kyobashi, Chūō, Tokyo, Japan
- Key people: Yaichi Kimura (Chairman); Keizo Morikawa (President and CEO)
- Products: Petroleum; Natural gas; Motor fuels; Aviation fuels; Petrochemicals; Wind power generation
- Services: Filling stations
- Revenue: ▲JPY 3,537 billion (FY 2013) (US$ 34.3 billion) (FY 2013)
- Net income: ▲JPY 4.34 billion (FY 2013) (US$ 42.1 million) (FY 2013)
- Owner: Cosmo Energy Holdings
- Number of employees: 1,837 (consolidated, as of March 31, 2014)
- Website: Official website

Cosmo Oil Company, Limited (コスモ石油株式会社, Kosumo Sekiyu kabushiki gaisha) is a Japanese petrochemical company. It is Japan's third-biggest refiner by sales after Eneos and Idemitsu Kosan.

== History ==
Cosmo in Japan traces its corporate roots to Maruzen Petroleum (丸善石油株式会社), a company established in 1931, although the oil business operated by Maruzen was originally established by Zenzo Matsumura in Kobe in 1907.

Cosmo Oil Company was formed on April 1, 1986, through the merger of Maruzen Petroleum and Daikyo Petroleum, a group of oil businesses based in Niigata Prefecture, which merged in 1939.

A major fire occurred at the Cosmo refinery in Ichihara, as a result of the 2011 Tōhoku earthquake. It was extinguished after ten days, injuring six people and destroying storage tanks The ultimate cause was traced to the collapse of supports for LPG Tank 364, which had been filled with water and undergoing hydrostatic testing at the time the earthquake struck. The collapse fractured LPG pipes, releasing gas that then ignited, in turn igniting LPG in several adjacent tanks.

In February 2015, the company said it will reorganize itself under a holding company to boost profitability. Also in 2015, in March, Cosmo Oil formed an LPG joint-venture, by merging its LPG business with three other company's LPG units. The new company, named Gyxis Corporation, started effective operations on April 1, 2015. Along Cosmo, the other three shareholding companies are Showa Shell Sekiyu, TonenGeneral Sekiyu, and Sumitomo Corporation, all with 25% of the ownership.

== Refineries ==
Cosmo operates three refineries, all of which are located in Japan:

- Ichihara, Chiba (former Maruzen refinery): 220,000 barrels per day (35,000 m^{3}/d)
- Yokkaichi, Mie (former Daikyo refinery): 175,000 barrels per day (27,800 m^{3}/d)
- Sakai, Osaka (former Maruzen refinery): 100,000 barrels per day (16,000 m^{3}/d)

In August 2012, the company announced that it will close its Sakaide plant in southwest Japan. The refinery, which was closed and turned into an oil terminal in July 2013, was a former Asia Oil refinery with a capacity of 120,000 barrels per day (19,000 m^{3}/d).

== Gallery ==
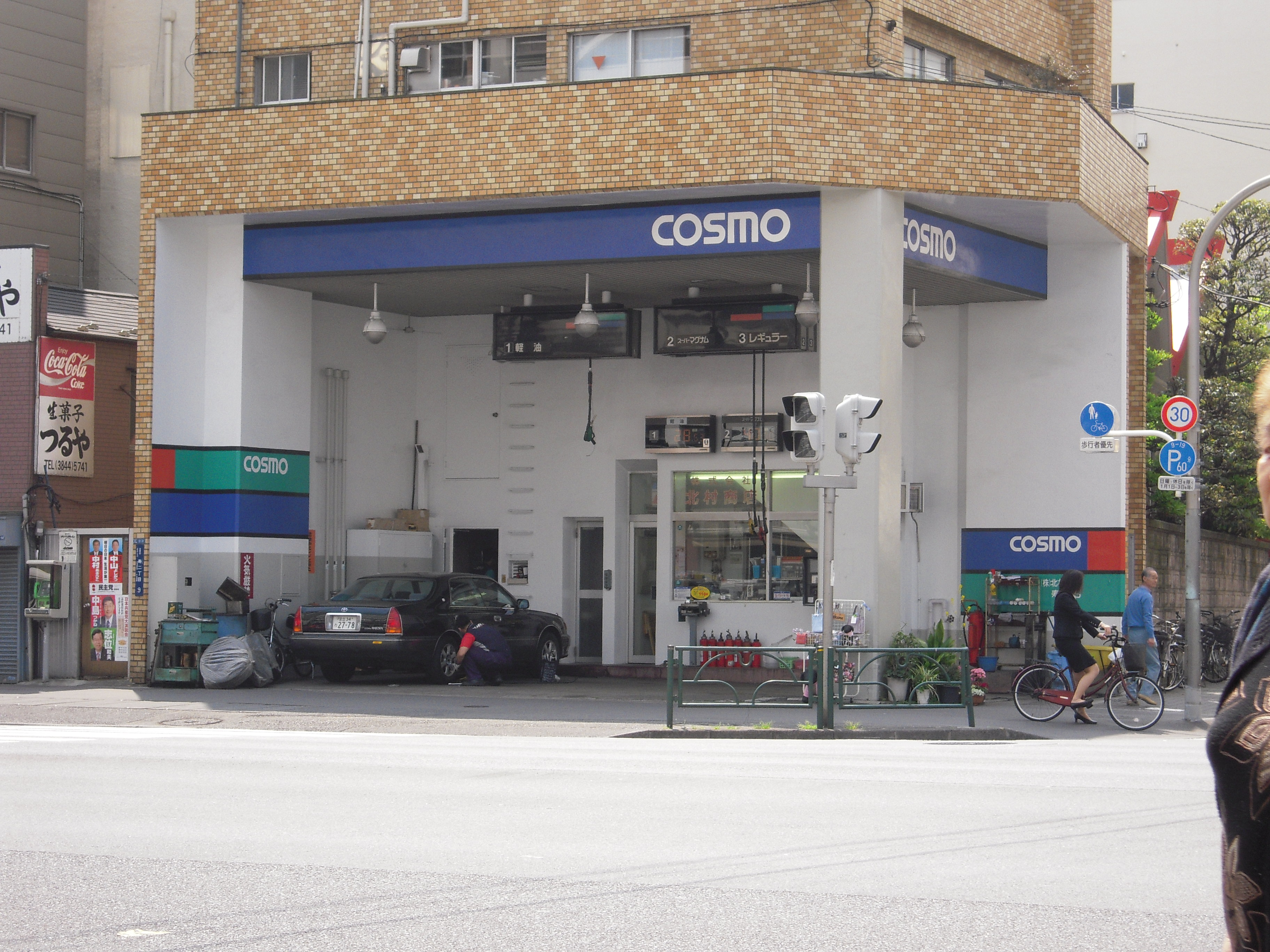
A Cosmo service station in Taitō

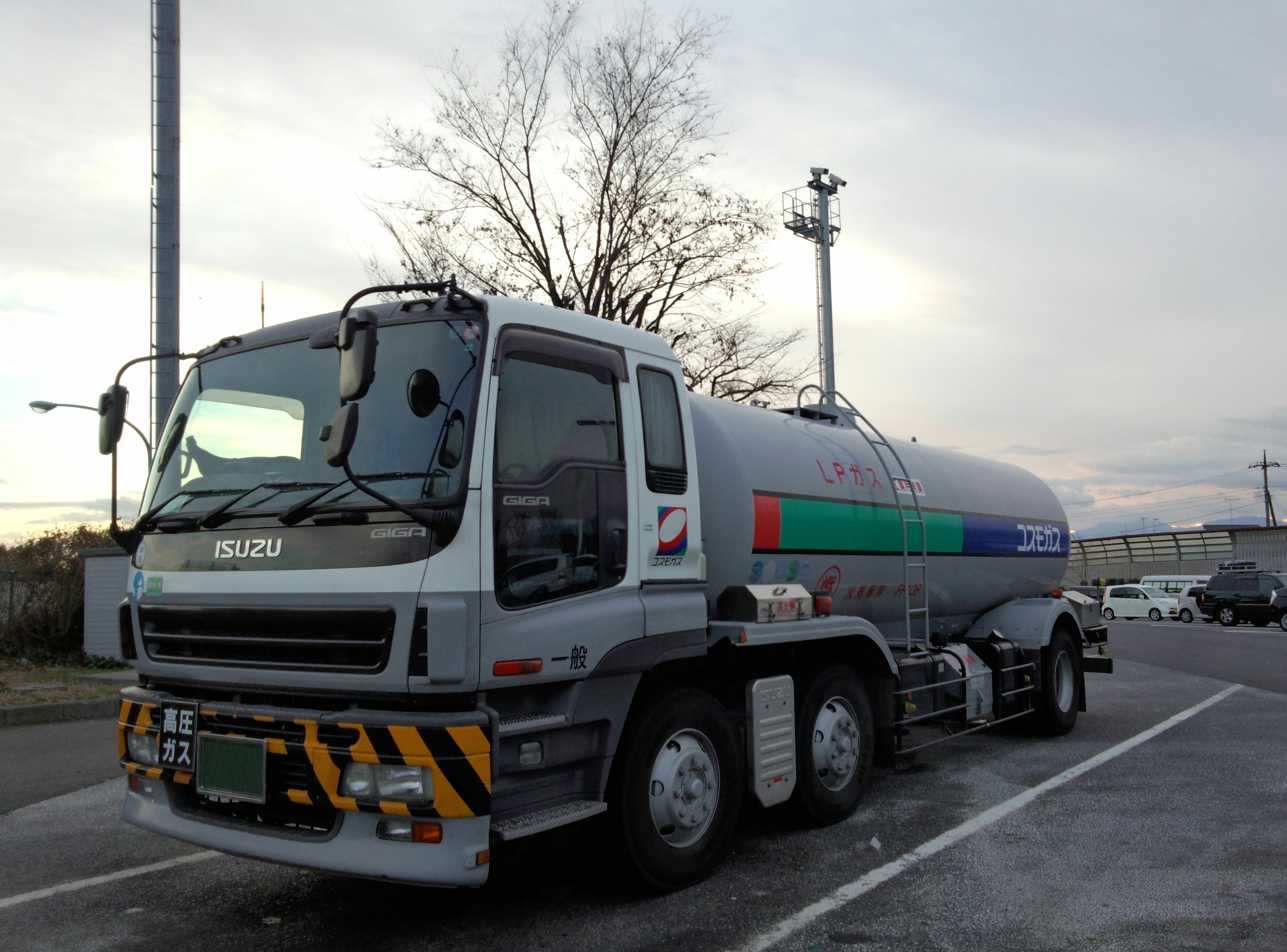
A Cosmo LPG truck

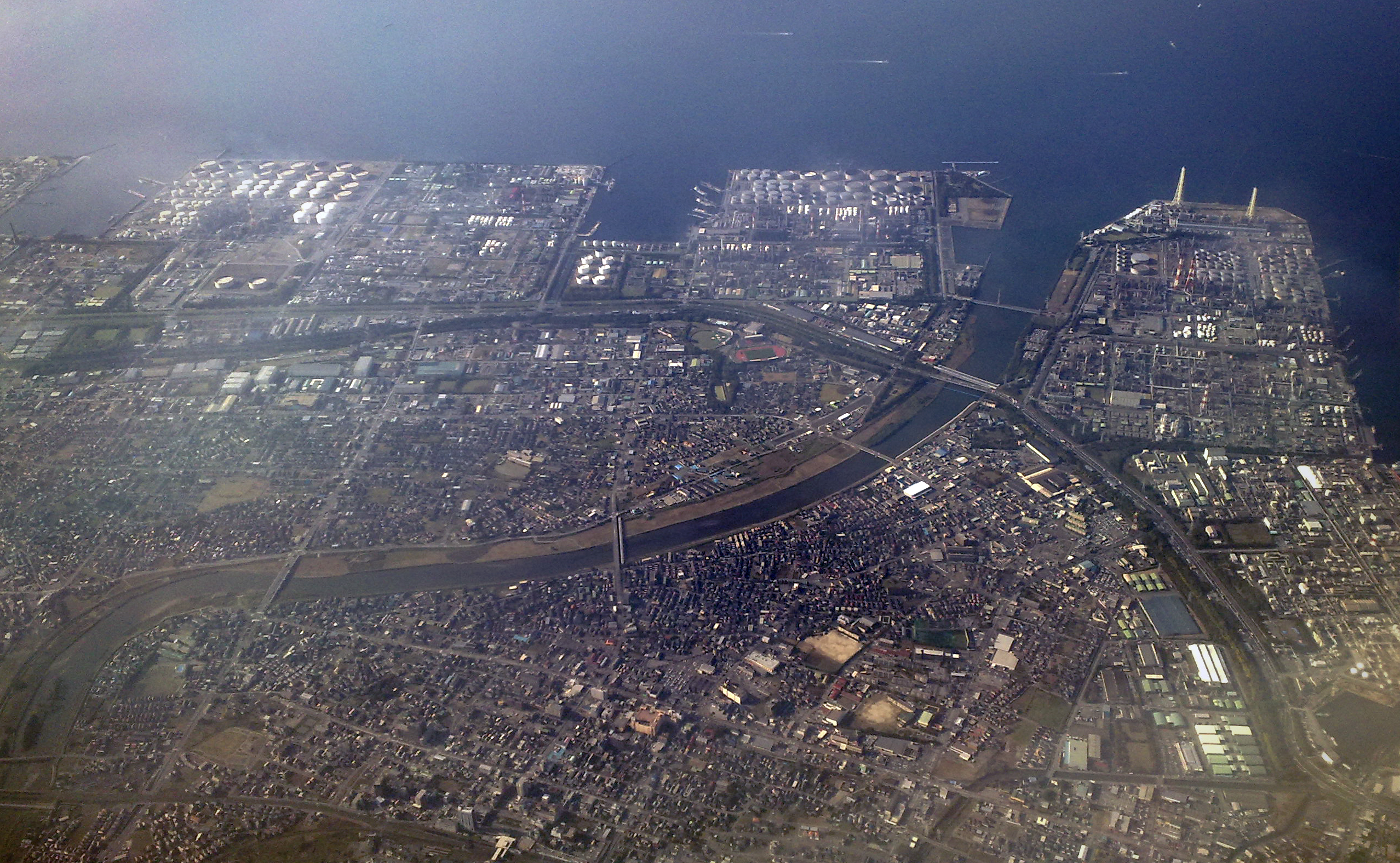
An aerial view north-west of the Port of Chiba (Cosmo Chiba refinery seen left of the river mouth)

== See also ==
- Cosmo Oil Yokkaichi F.C., former football club, originally owned by the Daikyo refinery.
