= Northwest Field =

U.S. military installation on Guam

- Part of Andersen Air Force Base
- Yigo in Guam, United States
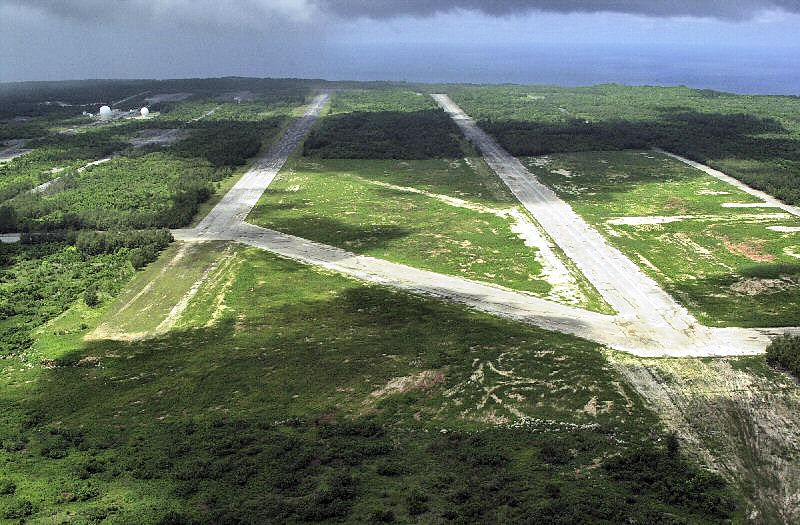
- Northwest Field as seen from the air in 2002

Site information
- Owner: United States Air Force
- Controlled by: Pacific Air Forces
- Condition: Operational, in limited use

Location
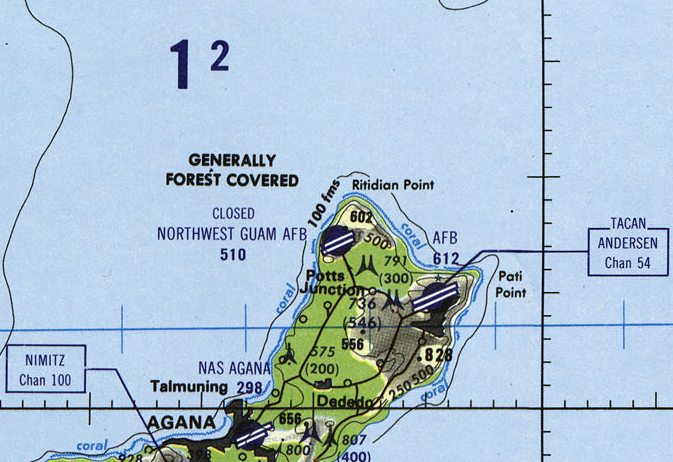
- Northwest Field on a 1988 map
- Northwest Field on a 1988 map Northwest Field (Pacific Ocean)
- Coordinates: 13.6253°N 144.8580°E

Site history
- Built: 8 January 1945 – 1 June 1945
- Built by: 25th Naval Construction Battalion; 48th Naval Construction Battalion; 53rd Naval Construction Battalion; 94th Naval Construction Battalion; 1886th Engineer Aviation Battalion; 1899th Engineer Aviation Battalion
- In use: 1945–1949 c. 2010–present

Airfield information
- Elevation: 510 feet (155 m) AMSL
Runways
Direction	Length and surface
	8,000 feet (2,438 m) Paved

Northwest Field (NWF; historically Northwest Guam Air Force Base) is a military airfield on the West Pacific island of Guam. Originally built during World War II, Northwest Field was closed as an airfield in 1949 but has been used for other military activity since, including housing a satellite tracking station, air defenses, and being used for training.

== History ==
Built from 8 January 1945 to 1 June 1945 as a B-29 Superfortress base by the U.S. Navy's 25th, 48th, 53rd, and 94th Naval Construction Battalions, as well as the U.S. Army's 1886th and 1899th Engineer Aviation Battalions. Brigadier General Frank A. Armstrong of the U.S. Army Air Forces was the first to land his B-29 at the newly constructed airfield. Fleet Admiral Chester W. Nimitz called the airfield's completion "another step along the road to Tokyo". After its initial use as a bomber base it became a fighter base in 1946.

Units deployed to the airfield included the 315th Bombardment Wing, stationed from 1945 to 1946, and the 23rd Fighter Group, stationed from 1946 to 1949.

In September 1946, the airfield took severe damage from Typhoon Querida, with the 21st Fighter Group's barracks completely leveled.

The airfield was closed in 1949.

In 1949, Northwest Field was one of two locations being considered for the establishment of an international airport on Guam, the other being Harmon Air Force Base, with the military favoring Northwest Field and airlines favoring Harmon AFB. Harmon was later consolidated into Naval Air Station Agana and is now the site of Antonio B. Won Pat International Airport.

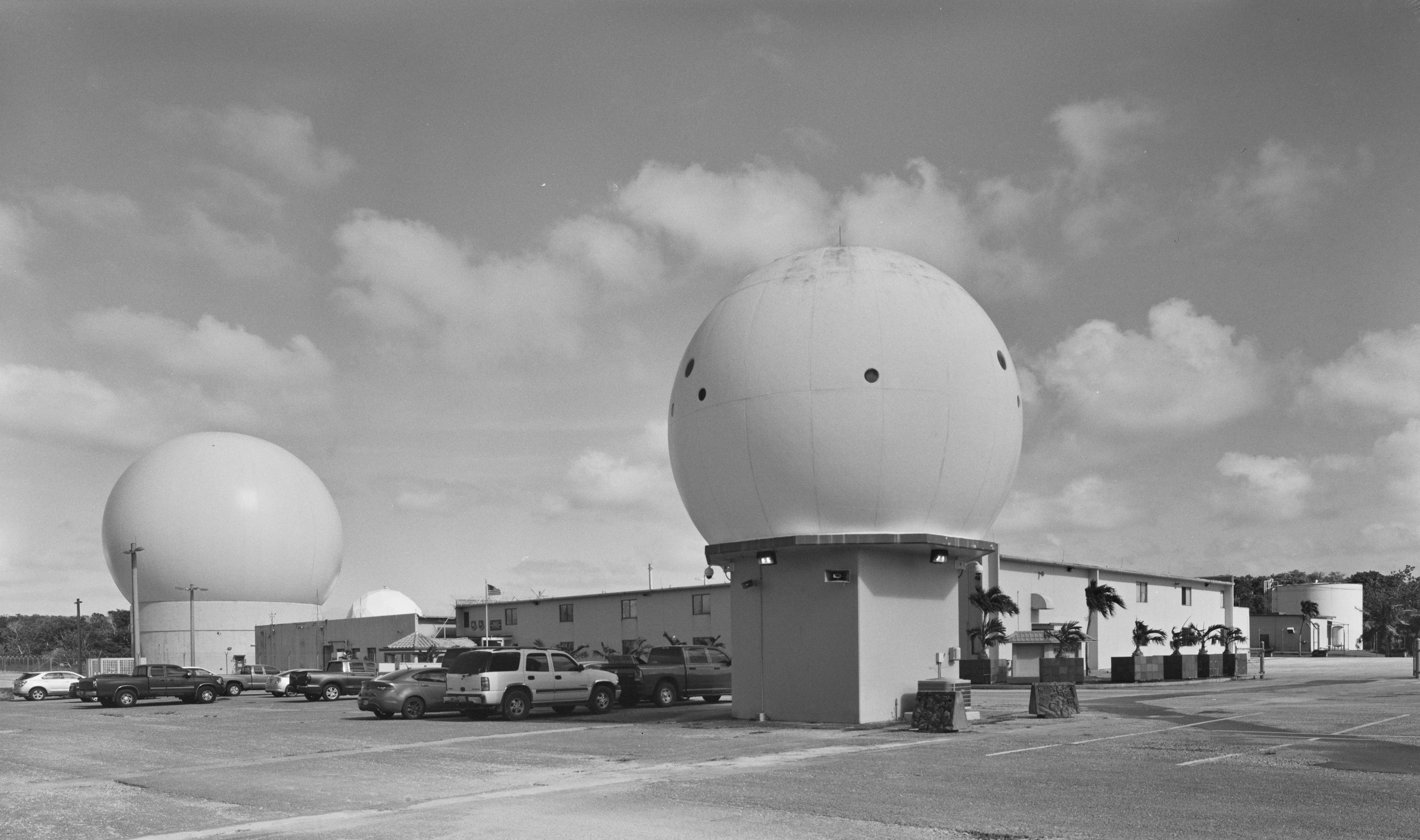
The satellite tracking station at Northwest Field

Since 1965, a satellite tracking station has been located at Northwest Field. As of 2023, the station is operated by Detachment 2 of the 21st Space Operations Squadron.

In 1990, Northwest Field was being considered as a site for a U.S. Navy Relocatable Over-the-Horizon Radar. The project drew controversy due to the threat it posed to a native bird habitat. In March 1991, the Navy cancelled the project, citing high costs and a reduced threat in the West Pacific.

Since at least 2001, the Air Force has used Northwest Field for various types of training, including low-level cargo drops. Since around 2010, the airfield has also been used for training related to operating at airfields in austere conditions, including being one of the locations to host Cope North exercises. In this capacity, US$9.8 million were awarded by the U.S. military for repairs to the field's northern runway in 2018.

Since April 2013, a Terminal High Altitude Area Defense (THAAD) anti-ballistic missile defense system has been stationed at the field.

Since at least 2012, Northwest Field and adjacent Ritidian Point were eyed by the U.S. military as a possible site for a U.S. Marine Corps firing range complex, becoming the preferred location over other options on Guam by 2013, in part due to its proximity to the site of the new U.S. Marine Corps base and because the land was already owned by the federal government.

The military's plan drew controversy, with locals complaining that part of Guam National Wildlife Refuge would be closed up to 39 weeks a year, due to being used as the proposed range's safety zone. Ritidian Point is also the site of among other things, ancient burial sites, drawing thousands of tourists to the area each year according to Guamanian politician Judith Won Pat, who in 2014 asked for the military to consider other options.

In 2017, Naval Facilities Engineering Systems Command (NAVFAC) awarded a $78 million contract to a local construction company for the construction of a complex consisting of four live-fire training ranges, as well as supporting structures. The proposed location of a fifth range, a "multi-purpose machine gun range", was relocated in 2019 to protect the endangered Serianthes nelsonii tree. The $122 million contract for construction of the fifth range was awarded by NAVFAC in 2021, with an expected completion date in October 2024.

== Accidents and incidents ==
- On 17 May 1947, an AT-6 Texan trainer aircraft crashed south of the airfield, killing both U.S. Army officers on board.

== See also ==
- US military installations in Guam
