= A Life at Stake =

1955 film

- Theatrical release poster
- Directed by: Paul Guilfoyle
- Written by: Russ Bender; Hank McCune
- Produced by: Andy C. Burger; Charles Maxwell; Hank McCune
- Starring: Angela Lansbury; Keith Andes; Douglass Dumbrille; Claudia Barrett; Jane Darwell
- Cinematography: Ted Allan
- Edited by: Frank Sullivan
- Music by: Les Baxter
- Production company: Hank McCune Productions
- Distributed by: Filmakers Releasing Organization; Monarch Film Corporation (UK)
- Release date: March 18, 1955
- Running time: 76 minutes
- Country: United States
- Language: English

A Life at Stake is a 1955 American film noir directed by Paul Guilfoyle and starring Angela Lansbury, Keith Andes and Claudia Barrett. It was an independent production, made and distributed outside the Hollywood studio system.

== Plot ==
Los Angeles architect and builder Edward Shaw, facing hard times, is approached by Doris Hillman with a business proposal to buy land together. Doris will build and sell houses on the property, leveraging her experience as a former real-estate broker. Her husband Gus, a wealthy businessman, will contribute $500,000 toward the venture.

Doris quickly seems interested in more than a purely professional relationship. Shaw starts an affair with her and accepts the business offer. However, an accidental discovery leaves him convinced that the Hillmans' interest lies less in the long-term profits of the venture than in the $175,000 key-man insurance policy covering Shaw's life that he purchased as a precondition for the deal. He fears that an attempt on his life is imminent.

Doris' younger sister Madge also develops a romantic interest in Shaw. Without knowing what Doris has planned, Madge reveals to Shaw that her sister was married previously to a man who died in Wyoming when his car crashed over a bridge. In similar fashion, Shaw is drugged by Gus and nearly falls from a cliff in his car.

The police are skeptical about Shaw's story and the insurance company refuses to cancel the policy, as Gus has portrayed Shaw as a man who is trying to steal his wife. Madge teams with Shaw to foil her sister's scheme, but Doris lures him to her mountain cabin and shoots him. Wounded, Shaw sees the Hillmans struggle and then fall to their deaths through a clifftop doorway, just minutes before Madge and the cops arrive.

== Cast ==
- Angela Lansbury as Doris Hillman
- Keith Andes as Edward Shaw
- Douglass Dumbrille as Gus Hillman
- Claudia Barrett as Madge Neilan
- Jane Darwell as Landlady
- Gavin Gordon as Sam Pearson
- Charles Maxwell as Lt. Hoff
- William Henry as Myles Norman
- Kathleen Mulqueen as Mary
- Dan Sturkie as Officer Biff
- Jeane Wood as Mabel, the maid
- Robert Haver as Mechanic

== Soundtrack ==
- "Summer Interlude" by Hank McCune and Les Baxter

== Reception ==
In a contemporary review, the Los Angeles Times critic wrote: "Something of a study in fear is 'A Life at Stake' ... If the film had made a little more of this slant, even though it's not new, and a little less of the frayed old bad-girl-truly-in-love angle, it would have been a better picture. Also in trying to bring some mystery into the yarn, the makers at moments outfoxed themselves, leaving some fuzzy edges."
