= Chain Lightning (1950 film) =

1950 film by Stuart Heisler

- Theatrical release poster
- Directed by: Stuart Heisler
- Written by: Lester Cole (from story "These Many Years"); Liam O'Brien (screenplay) and Vincent B. Evans (screenplay)
- Produced by: Anthony Veiller
- Starring: Humphrey Bogart; Eleanor Parker; Raymond Massey
- Cinematography: Ernest Haller
- Edited by: Thomas Reilly
- Music by: David Buttolph
- Distributed by: Warner Bros. Pictures
- Release dates: February 17, 1950 (Los Angeles); February 19, 1950 (New York)
- Running time: 94 minutes 90 minutes (Germany)
- Country: United States
- Languages: English; Multiple translations
- Budget: $1,477,000
- Box office: $2,555,000

Chain Lightning is a 1950 American aviation film. The screenplay was written by Liam O'Brien and Vincent B. Evans, who had been a bombardier on the Boeing B-17 Flying Fortress Memphis Belle during World War II, based on the story "These Many Years" by blacklisted communist writer Lester Cole (under the pseudonym J. Redmond Prior). Cole's credit on the film was officially restored by the Writers Guild of America in 1997.

The film stars Humphrey Bogart as a test pilot along with Eleanor Parker, Raymond Massey and Richard Whorf. It is one of Bogart's final Warner Bros. films, ending a 17-year association.

== Plot ==
Lt. Colonel Matt Brennan, a B-17 bomber pilot in World War II, runs a civilian flying school in peacetime. He is reunited with his old Army Air Force buddy, Major Hinkle.

Brennan is offered a job at the Willis Aircraft Company as chief test pilot for an experimental high-speed jet fighter known as the JA-3, designed by Carl Troxell, who had accompanied Brennan on a bombing mission over Germany during World War II to evaluate the B-17's real-life performance.

In order to prove the new JA-3, capable of speeds up to 1,400 mph (2,300 km/h), Brennan convinces Willis that a record-breaking, high-altitude, long-distance flight from Nome, Alaska to Washington, D.C. over the North Pole will both impress the government and become a press sensation. At the same time, Troxell tries to finish developing a safer version of the revolutionary aircraft, the JA-4. He is killed during a high-altitude test flight while testing an escape pod.

The record-breaking flight is a huge success. Brennan earns $30,000, enough to propose marriage to Jo Holloway, his former wartime flame who is now Willis's secretary. Despite his earlier reservations about the need for safety systems and with Troxell's death in mind, Brennan secretly flies the second JA-4 for the government demonstration. He ejects in the escape pod, proving that Troxell's design is safe for pilots. On safely landing, he falls into Jo's arms.

== Cast ==
- Humphrey Bogart as Lt. Colonel Matthew "Matt" Brennan
- Eleanor Parker as Joan "Jo" Holloway
- Raymond Massey as Leland Willis
- Richard Whorf as Carl Troxell
- James Brown as Major Hinkle
- Roy Roberts as Major General Hewitt
- Morris Ankrum as Ed Bostwick
- Fay Baker as Mrs. Willis
- Fred Sherman as Jeb Farley (uncredited)
- Claudia Barrett as Student Pilot

== Production ==
Production still showing the Willis JA-3 full-size prop

Principal filming took place from April 16, 1949, to July 1949, but final production was delayed from release until 1950. In order to realistically depict the flight testing, permission was obtained to film at various Air Force bases, including Muroc Army Air Field (now Edwards Air Force Base). Location shooting also occurred at the San Fernando Valley Airport (now Van Nuys Airport). A realistic full-scale JA-3/JA-4 model created by Paul Mantz, the aerial sequence director, was built for $15,000. Mantz envisioned an "aircraft of tomorrow" when designing the centerpiece aircraft and models, accurately predicting much of today's modern jet-aircraft technology.

The model was based on a derelict Bell P-39 Airacobra fuselage that had been reworked by Vince Johnson, an expert "lofter". The Warner Bros. contract called for completion of a realistic fighter able to taxi and deploy parachutes. Along with the full-scale model used for most of the ground sequences, a number of scale models were built. A Willis JA-3 fiberglass miniature used in the production, measuring 80 in. long and a wingspan of 59 in., was auctioned in 2009 for $1,300.

Revisiting his use of the wartime fleet of aircraft that he had obtained for films such as Twelve O'Clock High (1949), Mantz's B-17F, 42–3369, appearing as “Naughty Nellie,” recreated the wartime missions that the central character recalls in a flashback sequence. Stock footage of bomber missions over Germany includes a brief view of the Messerschmitt Me 163 rocket fighter that is the inspiration for the later postwar supersonic fighter envisioned by one of the central characters.

== Reception ==
In a contemporary review for The New York Times, critic A. H. Weiler wrote: "Make no mistake about it, Warner Brothers, who obviously want audiences to know where they're going, are aware that we're living on a supercharged planet. And, in 'Chain Lightning,' ... they are proving that they are first on the jet-propelled bandwagon with Hollywood's initial excursion into the wild blue yonder aboard the propellerless, supersonic aircraft. Like its title, this vehicle moves with exciting speed when it is airborne, but it slows down to a plodding walk as routine as a mailman's rounds when it hits the ground."

Critic Edwin Schallert of the Los Angeles Times wrote: "These are new aviation thrills in a medium that has just about worn out the ordinary, or gas-driven, kind, and it's all made fairly comprehensible besides, despite the technical references and the Buck Rogers goings-on. The springboard for these unusual activities is a dramatic story which in its enactment struck me as being, like Bogart, peculiarly nerveless. It is not helped by being unfolded in flashback. and is intermittently concerned with a clash of principles ... The love interest is equally perfunctory, Bogart periodically stifling his natural instincts with regard to Eleanor Parker because he doesn't believe a test pilot would make a proper husband for her. And such a pretty girl, too."

The film was released in multiple versions for 11 different countries. In Germany, it was known as Des Teufels Pilot.

When Chain Lightning premiered at the recently renamed Edwards Air Force Base, where location shooting had taken place, veteran pilots such as Chuck Yeager were able to easily spot the film's artifice, especially in a scene in which the Willis JA-3 is towed down the runway with the tow cable clearly evident.

According to Warner Bros. accounts, the film earned $1,665,000 domestically and $890,000 foreign.

== Home media ==
Chain Lightning was released in VHS format in 1992 by MGM/UA Home Entertainment, though without the corrected credit for blacklisted communist writer Lester Cole. Warner Archives released an official DVD on January 24, 2012, and Blu-ray on June 22, 2021.
