= The Go-Getter (1956 film) =

1956 film

- British poster
- Directed by: Leigh Jason; Leslie Goodwins
- Written by: Earl Baldwin; Charles Maxwell
- Produced by: Charles Maxwell
- Starring: Hank McCune; Hanley Stafford; Beverly Garland
- Cinematography: Charles Straumer
- Edited by: Frank Sullivan
- Music by: Bob Walters
- Production company: Pacific Coast Pictures
- Distributed by: Globe Releasing Corporation; British Lion (UK)
- Release date: 1956
- Running time: 78 minutes
- Country: United States
- Language: English

The Go-Getter is a 1956 American comedy film directed by Leigh Jason and Leslie Goodwins and starring Hank McCune, Hanley Stafford and Beverly Garland.

== Cast ==
- Hank McCune as Henry R. 'Hank' McCune
- Hanley Stafford as Lester Mayberry
- Thurston Hall as Mr. Higgins
- Ray Collins as J.P. Miller
- Beverly Garland as Peggy, Mayberry's Secretary
- Andrew Tombes as Mr. Symington
- Mary Treen as Miss Wellington, aptitude tester
- Gene Roth as Head File Clerk
- Arthur Q. Bryan as The Handyman
- Maurice Cass as Elderly Professor
- Ellen Corby as The Maid
- Douglass Dumbrille as Dr. Baker
- Tom Powers as Miller's Business Partner
- Veola Vonn as A Clerk

== Bibliography ==
- Verswijver, Leo. "Movies Were Always Magical": Interviews with 19 Actors, Directors, and Producers from the Hollywood of the 1930s through the 1950s. McFarland, 2003.
