= 487th Air Expeditionary Wing =

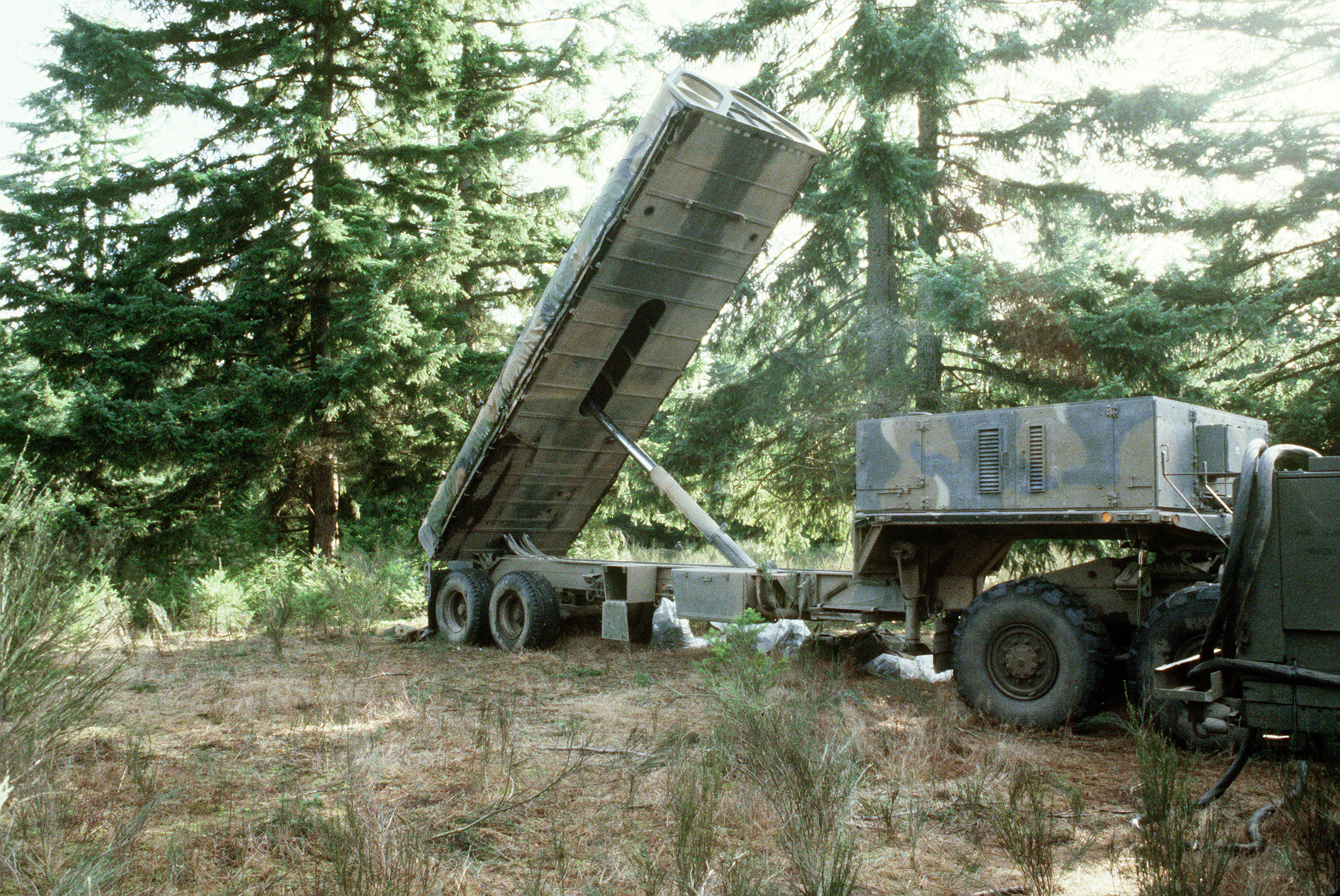
- BGM-109G Gryphon ready to launch
- Active: 1943–1945; 1983–1991, 2003
- Country: United States
- Branch: United States Air Force
- Nickname: Gentlemen from Hell (World War II)
- Mottos: Strength and Precision
- Engagements: European Theater of Operations
- Decorations: Air Force Outstanding Unit Award

Commanders
- Notable commanders: Beirne Lay Jr.

Insignia
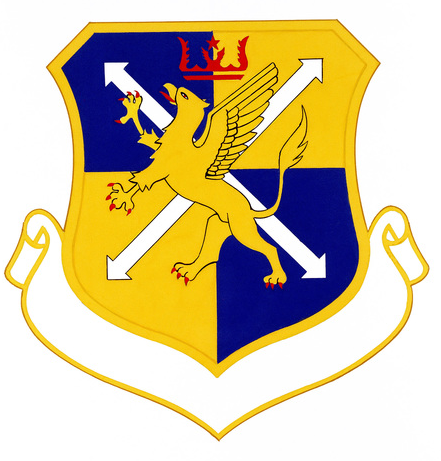
- 487th Tactical Missile Wing emblem (Note: Approved 19 May 1983. Description: Quarterly Azure and Or, a saltire diminished, couped and barbed Argent; over all a griffin segreant of the second [color mentioned], armed and langued Gules and in chief an astral crown of the like [color], all within a diminished bordure of the second [color mentioned]. Significance: The blue and yellow colors represent the Air Force and red is for courage and strength. The arrows signify flight. The [griffin] is symbolically a warlike character. It is half-eagle and half-lion, with the cunning and intelligence of the eagle in flight and possessing the courage and valor of the lion in battle. The astral crown denotes command in the air and obedience to guidance.)

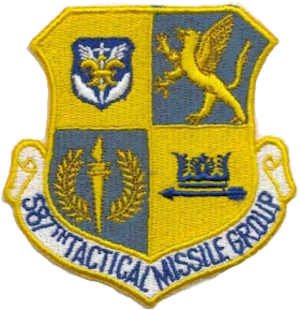
- Patch with emblem used by 587th Tactical Missile Group (Note: The three missile groups of the 38th Tactical Missile Wing used the wing emblem with the group designations on the scroll.)

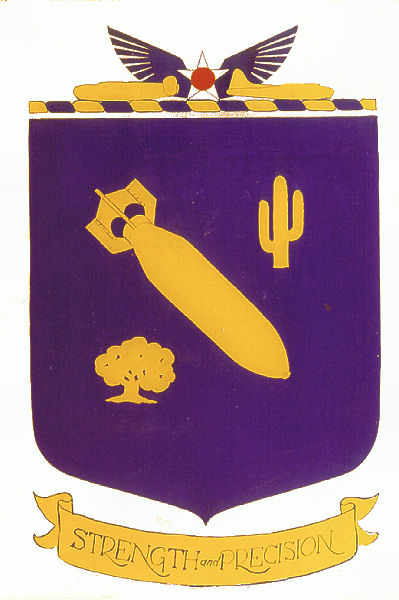
- Unofficial 487th Bombardment Group emblem (Note: This emblem was used while the group was located in England, but never received approval. de Jong, Ivo (12 February 2016). "Memorandum about 487th Bomb Group Insignia" (PDF). 487th Bomb Group (H) Association. p. 4.)

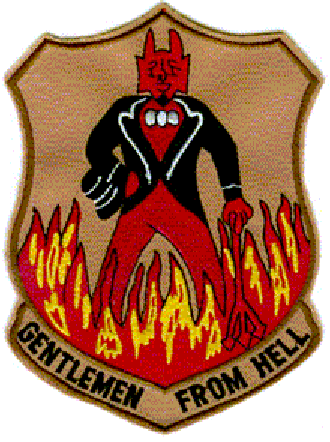
- Unofficial 487th Bombardment Group emblem (Note: This emblem was used while the group was training at Alamogordo AAF. Little use was made of this unit after the group moved to England. de Jong, Ivo (12 February 2016). "Memorandum about 487th Bomb Group Insignia" (PDF). 487th Bomb Group (H) Association. pp. 1–2.)
- Tail Code: Square P

The 487th Air Expeditionary Wing is a provisional United States Air Force unit assigned to the United States Air Forces in Europe. As a provisional unit, it may be activated or inactivated at any time. The unit's last known assignment was in 2003 at Cairo West Air Base, Egypt, during Operation Iraqi Freedom.

The first predecessor of the wing is the 487th Bombardment Group, a United States Army Air Forces unit. It was activated in September 1943. After training in the United States, it deployed to the European Theater of Operations, where it engaged in combat with Consolidated B-24 Liberators. In the summer of 1944, it was withdrawn from combat to convert to the Boeing B-17 Flying Fortress, than continued in combat until the spring of 1945. It led the largest Eighth Air Force mission of the war on 24 December 1944. It flew 185 combat missions, the last being on 21 April 1945. Following V-E Day, the unit returned to Drew Field, Florida, where it was inactivated on 7 November 1945.

The wing's second predecessor is the 587th Tactical Missile Wing, which operated TM-61 Matador tactical cruise missiles in German during the Cold War from 1958 until 1962, when it was inactivated and its operational squadron was assigned directly to its parent 38th Tactical Missile Wing.

The two groups were consolidated in January 1982 as the 487th Tactical Missile Wing. The wing operated BGM-109G Ground Launched Cruise Missiles until it was inactivated in 1991 with the implementation of the Intermediate-Range Nuclear Forces Treaty.

== History ==
=== World War II ===
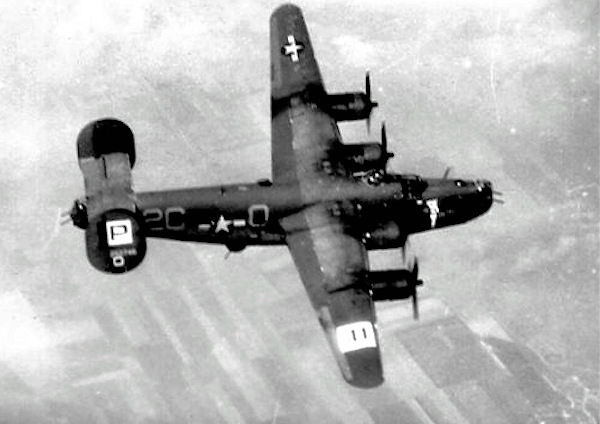
838th Bombardment Squadron B-24H Liberator, "Ready Betty" (Note: Aircraft is Ford B-24H-15-FO Liberator serial 42-52746. This plane was transferred to the 446th Bombardment Group in August 1944. It crashed in Belgium on 27 December 1944 on a mission to Kaiserslautern. All aircrew parachuted to safety.)

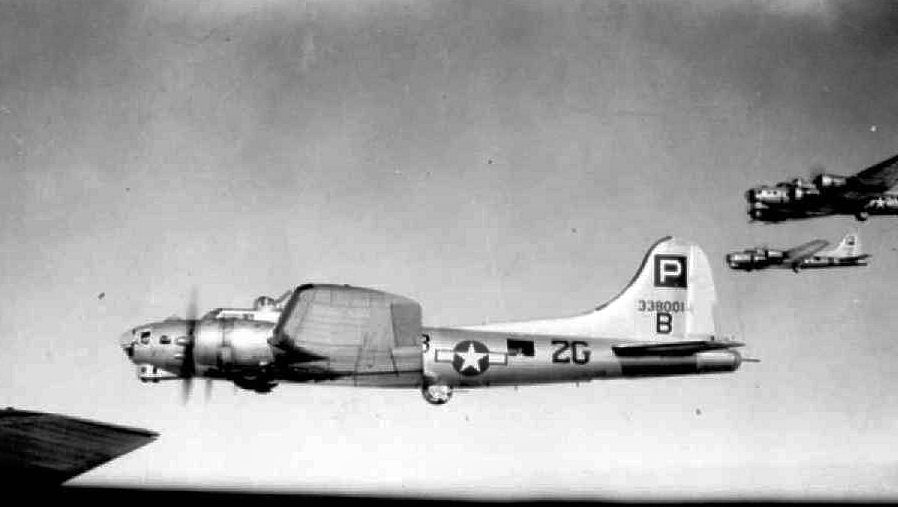
836th Bombardment Squadron Boeing B-17G Flying Fortress (Note: Aircraft is Boeing B-17G-75-BO Flying Fortress serial 43-38001. It was shot down by antiaircraft artillery over Czechoslovakia on 17 April 1945. All aircrew parachuted to safety and were made Prisoners of War.)

The 487th Bombardment Group was activated at Bruning Army Air Field, Nebraska on 20 September 1943, with the 836th, 837th and 838th Bombardment Squadrons assigned as its original squadrons. The 8th Antisubmarine Squadron, which had helped form the group's cadre, joined the group on 14 October after being redesignated as the 839th Bombardment Squadron. The group trained with Consolidated B-24 Liberators until March 1944, when it departed for the European Theater of Operations. The ground echelon left Alamogordo Army Air Field, New Mexico on 10 March 1944 for the port of embarkation at Camp Kilmer, New Jersey, sailing on the SS Duchess of Bedford and arrived in Great Britain on 3 April. The air echelon departed via the southern ferry route on 23 March.

The group arrived at RAF Lavenham, its base in England, on 4 April 1944, with the air echelon arriving between 13 and 17 April. The 487th entered combat on 7 May 1944, bombing airfields in Normandy in preparation for Operation Overlord, the invasion of Normandy. Four days later, its commander, Lieutenant Colonel Beirne Lay Jr., was shot down, but evaded capture. (Note: After the war, Lay wrote the screenplay for the 1949 film Twelve O'Clock High.) During the Normandy landings, the group struck coastal defenses, road junctions, bridges and rolling stock. It supported British troops near Caen by attacking German troops and artillery redoubts and made similar attacks to support troops assaulting Brest. It provided support for Operation Market Garden, the attempt to seize bridgeheads across the Rhine River near Arnhem and Nijmegen in the Netherlands.

Because of its involvement with tactical operations, the group engaged in only limited strategic operations through August 1944. On 19 July 1944, the 487th was taken off combat operations, along with other units of the 92d Combat Bombardment Wing, to convert from the Liberator to the Boeing B-17 Flying Fortress, in a move that would transform the 3d Bombardment Division to an all Flying Fortress organization. After completing the transition to the B-17 on 1 August 1944, the unit began to focus on strategic targets until March 1945. It attacked oil refineries in Merseburg, Mannheim and Dulmen; factories in Nuremberg, Hanover and Berlin; and marshalling yards in Köln, Münster, Hamm and Neumunster.

On 24 December 1944, the group was the lead group on Eighth Air Force's largest mission of the war. (Note: Eighth Air Force launched 2,034 bombers on this raid and was joined by an additional 500 from the Royal Air Force and Ninth Air Force. Freeman, p. 201.) Brigadier General Frederick Castle, commander of the 4th Bombardment Wing commanded the raid and flew the 487th's lead aircraft. The group was attacked by Luftwaffe interceptors before escorting fighters could join the bomber formation. Three group planes were shot down, and an additional four were abandoned after making emergency landings in Belgium. Among the losses was General Castle's lead plane. He was awarded the Medal of Honor for taking control of the plane to permit other crew members to bail out and refusing to jettison the plane's bombload to avoid casualties to civilians or friendly troops below. From 1 January 1945 through the end of the war, the group's bombing accuracy was the highest in the 3d Air Division.

The group was diverted from the strategic bombing campaign to support ground troops during the Battle of the Bulge from December 1944 to January 1945. It also flew interdiction missions during the Allied crossings of the Rhine and final thrust across Germany. It flew its last combat mission on 21 April 1945. By the end of the war, the group had flown 185 missions (Note: A detailed list of group missions is at "Combat Missions". 487th Bomb Group (H) Association.) with the loss of 33 aircraft in combat, claiming 22 enemy aircraft destroyed.

The 487th remained in England after V-E Day. The air echelon began to fly their B-17s back to the United States in the last week of July, while the rest of the unit returned to the United States on the RMS Queen Elizabeth in August. It reassembled at Drew Field, Florida in September and was inactivated there on 7 November 1945.

=== Cold War ===
From September 1956, the 587th Tactical Missile Group operated Air Force missiles. It was assigned to the 38th Tactical Missile Wing and stationed at Sembach Air Base, West Germany. It controlled Mace and Matador tactical cruise missiles at three dispersed locations 2.6 to 12.5 miles from Sembach. It was inactivated on 25 September 1962.

On 11 January 1982, the 487th Bombardment Group, and 587th Tactical Missile Group were consolidated (effectively merged on paper) and the merged unit became the 487th Tactical Missile Wing. This was a purely administrative, on-paper change.

Activated in 1983, the 487th Tactical Missile Wing was stationed at Comiso Air Station in Sicily. Equipped with BGM-109G Ground Launched Cruise Missile, which the 302nd Tactical Missile Squadron used. Inactivated as a result of the 1987 Intermediate-Range Nuclear Forces Treaty in 1991.

=== 2003 invasion of Iraq ===
Converted to provisional status and activated as an Air Expeditionary Wing during 2003 invasion of Iraq in March 2003. Inactivated after 90 days of duty due to Air-Force intensive active combat phase of Iraqi invasion having been completed.

The following units were awarded Global War on Terrorism (Expeditionary) campaign participation credit:

- 487th Expeditionary Aircraft Maintenance Squadron
- 487th Expeditionary Civil Engineer Squadron
- 487th Expeditionary Communications Squadron
- 487th Expeditionary Logistics Readiness Squadron
- HQ 487th Expeditionary Medical Group
- HQ 487th Expeditionary Mission Support Group
- HQ 487th Expeditionary Maintenance Group
- 487th Expeditionary Maintenance Squadron
- HQ 487th Expeditionary Operations Group
- 487th Expeditionary Operations Support Squadron
- 487th Expeditionary Security Forces Squadron
- 487th Expeditionary Services Squadron

== Lineage ==
487th Bombardment Group

- Constituted as the 487th Bombardment Group (Heavy) on 14 September 1943

Activated on 20 September 1943
Redesignated 487th Bombardment Group, Heavy c. 5 April 1944
Inactivated on 7 November 1945

- Consolidated with the 587th Tactical Missile Group as the 487th Tactical Missile Wing on 11 January 1982

587th Tactical Missile Group

- Established as the 587th Tactical Missile Group c. 3 August 1956

Activated on 15 September 1956
Inactivated on 25 September 1962

- Consolidated with the 487th Bombardment Group as the 487th Tactical Missile Wing on 11 January 1982

487th Tactical Missile Wing

- 487th Bombardment Group and 587th Tactical Missile Group consolidated as the 487th Tactical Missile Wing on 11 January 1982

Activated on 30 June 1983
Inactivated c. 27 May 1991

- Redesignated 487th Air Expeditionary Wing and converted to provisional status on 1 March 2003

=== Assignments ===
- II Bomber Command, 20 September 1943
- Second Air Force, 6 October 1943 – 13 March 1944
- 92d Combat Bombardment Wing, 5 April 1944
- 4th Bombardment Wing (Provisional), 22 November 1944
- 4th Combat Bombardment Wing, 16 February–24 August 1945
- Third Air Force, 3 September–7 November 1945
- 701st Tactical Missile Wing, 15 September 1956
- 38th Tactical Missile Wing, 18 June 1958 – 25 September 1962
- Sixteenth Air Force, 30 June 1983 – c. 27 May 1991
- United States Air Forces in Europe to activate or inactivate any time after 1 March 2003

=== Components ===
- 302d Tactical Missile Squadron: See 822d Tactical Missile Squadron
- 487th Tactical Missile Maintenance Squadron: 20 June 1983 – 27 May 1991
- 11th Tactical Missile Squadron, 15 September 1956 – 18 June 1958
- 822d Tactical Missile Squadron (later 302d Tactical Missile Squadron): 18 June 1958 – 25 September 1962, 20 June 1983 – 27 May 1991 (112 missiles)
- 836th Bombardment Squadron, 20 September 1943 – 7 November 1945
- 837th Bombardment Squadron, 20 September 1943 – 7 November 1945
- 838th Bombardment Squadron, 20 September 1943 – 7 November 1945
- 839th Bombardment Squadron, 14 October 1943 – 7 November 1945

=== Stations ===
- Bruning Army Air Field, Nebraska, 20 September 1943
- Alamogordo Army Airfield, New Mexico, 15 December 1943 – c. 13 March 1944
- RAF Lavenham (AAF-137), England, 5 April 1944 – c. 26 August 1945
- Drew Field, Florida, 3 September–7 November 1945
- Sembach Air Base, West Germany, 15 September 1956 – 25 September 1962
- Comiso Air Station, Italy. June 1983 – May 1991

BGM-109G Missile site located at: 36°59′42″N 014°36′48″E

- Cairo West Airport, Egypt, March–May 2003

=== Aircraft and missiles ===
- Consolidated B-24 Liberator, 1943–1944
- Boeing B-17 Flying Fortress, 1944–1945
- BGM-109G Gryphon (1983–1991)

=== Awards and campaigns ===
Award streamer	Award	Dates	Notes
	Air Force Outstanding Unit Award	1 April 1959-30 January 1961	587th Tactical Missile Group
	Air Force Outstanding Unit Award	1 July 1985-30 June 1987	487th Tactical Missile Wing
	Air Force Outstanding Unit Award	1 July 1987-30 June 1988	487th Tactical Missile Wing
	Air Force Outstanding Unit Award	1 July 1988-30 June 1990	487th Tactical Missile Wing

Campaign Streamer	Campaign	Dates	Notes
	Air Offensive, Europe	4 April 1944 – 5 June 1944	487th Bombardment Group
	Air Combat, EAME Theater	4 April 1944 – 11 May 1945	487th Bombardment Group
	Normandy	6 June 1944 – 24 July 1944	487th Bombardment Group
	Northern France	25 July 1944 – 14 September 1944	487th Bombardment Group
	Rhineland	15 September 1944 – 21 March 1945	487th Bombardment Group
	Ardennes-Alsace	16 December 1944 – 25 January 1945	487th Bombardment Group
	Central Europe	22 March 1944 – 21 May 1945	487th Bombardment Group
	Global War on Terror	c. Mar 2003-c. May 2003	487th Air Expeditionary Wing

== See also ==
- List of BGM-109G GLCM Units
- B-17 Flying Fortress units of the United States Army Air Forces
- B-24 Liberator units of the United States Army Air Forces
