= Alan Wells (actor) =

American film and television actor

- Wells (right) with Jim Bannon in The Adventures of Champion, 1956
- Born: George Alan Wells; March 23, 1926; Benzonia, Michigan, U.S.
- Died: June 14, 2008 (aged 82); Reno, Nevada, U.S.
- Occupations: Film and television actor
- Spouse(s): Claudia Barrett (m. 1953; div. 1956) Barbara Lang (m. 1956; ann. 1958)

George Alan Wells (March 23, 1926 – June 14, 2008) was an American film and television actor.

== Life and career ==
Wells was born in Benzonia, Michigan. He began his screen career in 1949, appearing in the film Apache Chief. In 1950, he appeared in the films Love That Brute and The Man Who Cheated Himself.

Later in his career, Wells guest-starred in numerous television programs including The Life and Legend of Wyatt Earp, Tombstone Territory, 26 Men, Wanted Dead or Alive, Trackdown, Tales of Wells Fargo, Tombstone Territory, Tales of the Texas Rangers, Wichita Town, Highway Patrol and The Californians. He also appeared in films such as Cape Fear (as Young Blade), The Cosmic Man, Magnificent Roughnecks, Marty, The Return of Jack Slade, Beginning of the End, The Great Missouri Raid and Air Strike.

Wells retired from acting in 1963, last appearing in the film Gunfight at Comanche Creek.

== Death ==
Wells died at a nursing home in Reno, Nevada on June 14, 2008, at the age of 82.
