= 823rd Tactical Missile Squadron =

US Air Force unit

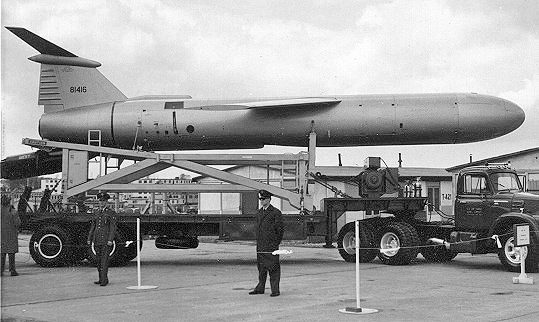
- MGM-13 Mace missile of the 38th Wing (Note: Missile is Martin TM-76B Mace, serial 58-1415.)
- Active: 1943–1946; 1962–1966
- Country: United States
- Branch: United States Air Force
- Role: Cruise Missile
- Nickname(s): Terrible Tigers (World War II)
- Engagements: Southwest Pacific Theater
- Decorations: Distinguished Unit Citation; Philippine Presidential Unit Citation

Insignia
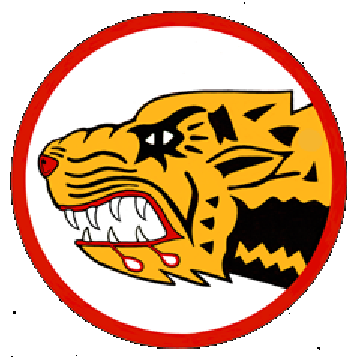
- 823rd Bombardment Squadron emblem

The 823rd Tactical Missile Squadron is an inactive United States Air Force unit. Its last assignment was with the 38th Tactical Missile Wing at Sembach Air Base, Germany, where it was inactivated on 25 September 1966, as the A model of the MGM-13 Mace was phased out of operation.

The squadron was first activated in Australia as the 823rd Bombardment Squadron in 1943, to bring the 38th Bombardment Group to full strength. It served in combat in the Southwest Pacific Theater, moving forward to Okinawa shortly before V-J Day. It earned a Distinguished Unit Citation and a Philippine Presidential Unit Citation for its combat actions. After serving briefly with the occupation forces in Japan, it was inactivated in September 1946.

The squadron was activated in 1962 as a tactical missile unit, when the 38th Tactical Missile Wing reorganized to have a separate squadron operating each of its missile sites near Sembach.

== History ==
=== World War II ===
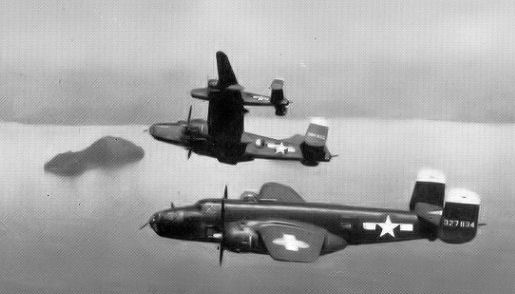
38th Bombardment Group B-25s

In the spring of 1943, the 42nd Bombardment Group deployed to the Pacific. However, two of its squadrons, the 76th and 406th Bombardment Squadrons had been detached from the 42nd Group while it was in the United States and did not move to the Pacific with it. To make up for this deficiency, two squadrons, the 69th and 70th Bombardment Squadrons were transferred to the group from the 38th Bombardment Group to bring it up to full strength.

To replace the lost squadrons, the 822nd and 823rd Bombardment Squadrons were activated in Australia in April 1943, and assigned to the 38th Group. However, the 823rd was not manned until about 20 June 1943, when it moved to Port Moresby, New Guinea and equipped with North American B-25 Mitchells. In August 1943, the squadron strafed Japanese defenses on Cape Gloucester in New Britain, to prepare for the amphibious attack on the island. For this action, it was awarded a Distinguished Unit Citation (DUC). It received a second DUC in June 1944 for missions in which it attacked Japanese airfields, harbors and shipping in New Guinea.

The squadron moved from New Guinea to the Moluccas in October 1944. From its new station, it attacked enemy installations in the southern Philippines to support the American invasion of Leyte. On 10 November, it struck a large enemy convoy near Ormoc Bay, for which the squadron was awarded its third DUC. In January 1945, the squadron moved to Lingayen Airfield on Luzon, from which it continued to support ground forces in the Philippines, but also mounted attacks on industrial targets in Taiwan and struck shipping along the coast of China. It temporarily moved to Palawan to attack enemy installations in preparation for the planned invasion of Borneo.

The following month, the 823rd moved to Okinawa, from which it flew several attacks on missions against southern Japan before V-J Day. In November, it moved to Itazuke Airfield, Japan, where it served as part of the occupation forces until inactivating in September 1946, when the 38th Group was reduced to two squadrons in post war reductions in military forces.

=== European missile unit ===
In September 1962, the 38th Tactical Missile Wing reorganized, eliminating its groups. In connection with this reorganization, United States Air Forces Europe expanded the missile squadrons of the wing to have one squadron operating each of its missile sites near Sembach Air Base, Germany. The squadron was redesignated the 823rd Tactical Missile Squadron, activated, and equipped with the MGM-13 Mace tactical missile. Its personnel and equipment were drawn from the 822nd Tactical Missile Squadron, which was already at Sembach.

The squadron's missiles were located at Site 2 "Invent" at Enkenbach 3.0 miles (4.8 km) SSE of Sembach at 49°28′0.62″N 007°53′53.38″E. It remained as a tactical missile unit until 25 September 1966, when USAFE withdrew its missiles from Sembach and the 38th Wing and its squadrons at Sembach were inactivated, as the A model of the Mace was retired and the last missiles were shipped to Eglin Air Force Base. Florida to be used as targets. (Note: One squadron of the 38th Wing, the 71st Tactical Missile Squadron, operated the B model of the Mace with an inertial guidance system and longer range, and remained active.)

== Lineage ==
- Constituted as the 823rd Bombardment Squadron (Medium) on 29 March 1943

Activated on 20 April 1943
Redesignated 823rd Bombardment Squadron, Medium c. 1944
Inactivated on 12 April 1946

- Redesignated 823rd Tactical Missile Squadron and activated on 10 September 1962 (not organized)

Organized on 25 September 1962
Inactivated on 25 September 1966

=== Assignments ===
- 38th Bombardment Group, 20 April 1943 – 12 April 1946
- United States Air Forces in Europe, 10 September 1962 (not organized)
- 38th Tactical Missile Wing, 25 September 1962 – 25 September 1966

=== Stations ===
- Townsville Airport, Australia, 20 April 1943
- Durand Airfield, Port Moresby, New Guinea, c. 20 June 1943
- Nadzab Airfield Complex, New Guinea, 7 March 1944
- Mokmer Airfield, Biak, Netherlands East Indies, 26 August 1944
- Pitoe Airfield, Morotai, Netherlands East Indies, 15 October 1944
- Lingayen Airfield, Luzon, Philippines, 1 February 1945
- Motobu Airfield, Okinawa, 24 July 1945
- Itazuke Airfield, Japan, 21 November 1945 – 25 September 1946
- Sembach Air Base, Germany, 25 September 1962 – 25 September 1966

- North American B-25 Mitchell, 1943–1946
- Martin MGM-13A Mace, 1962–1966

== See also ==
- List of United States Air Force missile squadrons
