= Charles Maxwell (actor) =

American actor (1913–93)

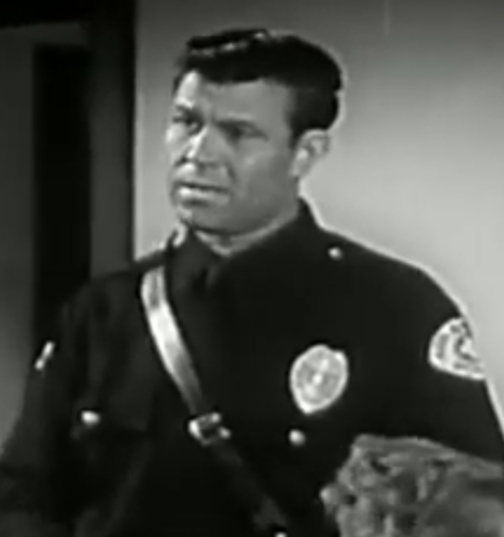
- Maxwell in A Life at Stake (1955)
- Born: Charles Carlton Maxwell; December 28, 1913; Long Island, New York, U.S.
- Died: August 7, 1993 (aged 79); Los Angeles, California, U.S.
- Occupations: Television actor television producer
- Years active: 1942–1971

Charles Carlton Maxwell (December 28, 1913 – August 7, 1993) was an American character actor and producer who worked primarily in television.

== Biography ==
Maxwell frequently appeared as a guest star in western television series, including Bonanza, Gunsmoke, The Texan, Lawman, Rawhide, and The Rifleman. In 1956 he appeared in a Greyhound Bus presentation, Down Liberty Road. In 1959, he was cast as General Phil Sheridan in the episode "One Bullet from Broken Bow" of the NBC western series, Bat Masterson, starring Gene Barry in the title role. He appeared again later that year as crooked hotel owner “Ron Davis” in the episode “Lady Luck”. He also appeared on NBC's Bonanza ten times as entirely different characters.

In the 1960s, Maxwell began appearing in a variety of guest roles. For example, in March 1961, he appeared as foreman Deeb Erickson on episode 25, season 2, of "The Rebel": "The Burying of Sammy Hart." He appeared in My Favorite Martian (first season, episode 23) as Jakobar in "An Old Friend of the Family". He was a regular on the short-lived series The Hank McCune Show and appeared as Corp. Giles on the World War II drama Combat! in the episode "Ask Me No Questions" in 1966. He also appeared as Virgil Earp in the Star Trek episode “Spectre of the Gun” in 1968.

He had his longest running role as the unseen, uncredited radio announcer on numerous episodes of Gilligan's Island.

== Filmography ==
Year	Title	Role	Notes
1942	They Flew Alone	Radio Commentator Great Britain	Voice
1954	Fireman Save My Child	Firetruck Driver	Uncredited
1955	Finger Man	Fred Amory	
1955	A Life at Stake	Police Lt. Hoff	
1956	The Search for Bridey Murphy	Father Bernard	
1956	The Go-Getter		
1958	The Power of the Resurrection	Investigator	
1965	Gunsmoke	Hy Evers	Season 10 Episode 34 “Honey Pot”
1965	Brainstorm	Insane Man in Courtroom	Uncredited
1968	Star Trek: "Sprectre of the Gun"	Virgil Earp	
1969	The Virginian (TV series)	Charlie Becker	Season 8 Episode 14 (Black Jade)
