= Claudia Barrett =

American actress (1929–2021)

- Barrett in 77 Sunset Strip, 1961
- Born: Imagene Williams; November 3, 1929; Los Angeles, California, U.S.
- Died: April 30, 2021 (aged 91); Palm Desert, California, U.S.
- Years active: 1949–1964; 2019
- Spouse: Alan Wells (m. 1953; div. 1956)

Claudia Barrett (born Imagene Williams; November 3, 1929 – April 30, 2021) was an American television and film actress.

== Early life ==
Barrett was born in Los Angeles, California, the daughter of Arvilla Benton and Iman J. Williams. She and her two brothers were raised as Christian Scientists. At the urging of her mother, she began taking acting classes at an early age to overcome her shyness. She won the Miss Sherman Oaks beauty contest. After she left Van Nuys High School she studied at the Pasadena Playhouse for a year and acted at Encino Little Theatre.

== Career ==
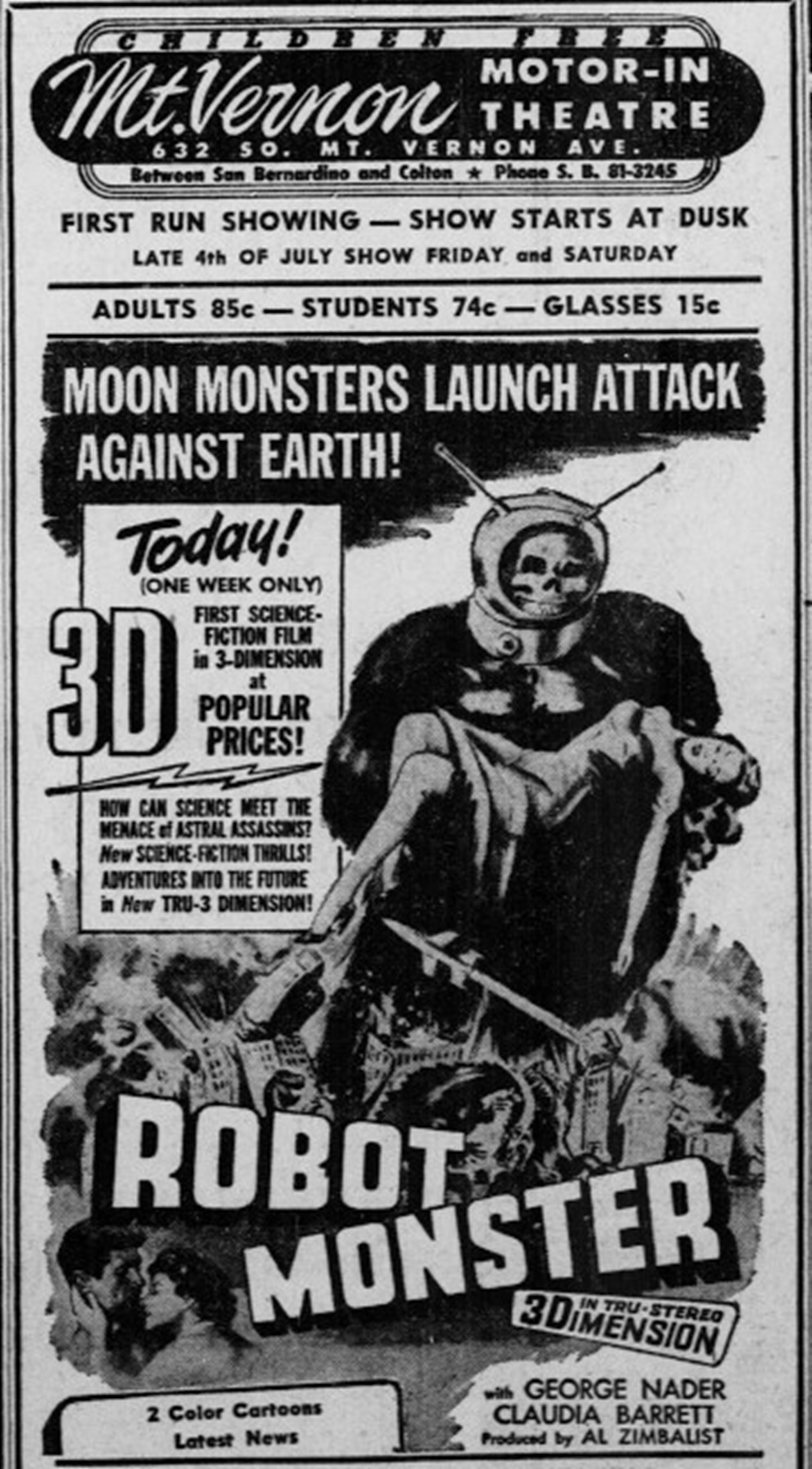
1953 poster for Robot Monster

Although she was mainly involved with television, Barrett's acting career began with film in the late 1940s and 1950s. At age 18, she was contracted to Warner Bros. under her name Imagene Williams. Her first movie appearance was in the 1949 film noir White Heat starring James Cagney and Virginia Mayo. The next year, she was cast as Dolly Travers in the MGM film The Happy Years, which starred Dean Stockwell, Darryl Hickman, and Leo G. Carroll. After leaving Warner Bros., she appeared in several films for Republic Pictures, a studio that mostly produced Westerns. She could ride a horse after learning as a Girl Scout. Her other film credits included The Story of Seabiscuit and Chain Lightning, as well as one of the leads of A Life at Stake, a murder drama starring Angela Lansbury. In 1953, she played one of the lead roles, Alice, in the low-budget science-fiction film Robot Monster, generally regarded as one of the worst films of all time. She accepted the part against the advice of her agent. She said the following about her role:

When you decide to make a movie, the decision is made for various reasons: money, fame, or working with a particular star or director. I just wanted to act. I was a professional actress for 14 years, and I really loved the business. And Robot Monster was a movie I enjoyed making.

Barrett appeared in numerous television shows, including The Abbott and Costello Show, China Smith, Space Patrol, That's My Boy, The Lone Ranger, 77 Sunset Strip, Colt .45, and The Jack Benny Program.

Despite her love of acting, Barrett's career diminished in the 1960s. In 1964, she retired from acting to work in film distribution and publicity. She was eventually hired at the Academy of Motion Picture Arts and Sciences, where she worked in the division that produced the awards for scientific and technical advances. She worked there from 1981 until 1995, when she retired from the film industry.

== Personal life ==
Barrett was married to actor Alan Wells between 1953 and 1956. Wells later married actress Barbara Lang, but on June 5, 1957, Lang sought an annulment, alleging that Wells had not received a final divorce from Barrett when he and Lang married.

During a 1984 visit to Ireland, Barrett took up painting and upon her return home, enrolled in art classes. In her later life, Barrett began to write poetry and followed the Centers for Spiritual Living; in 2019 she released a book of spiritual poetry. Barrett died of natural causes at her home in Palm Desert, California on April 30, 2021, at the age of 91.

== Filmography ==
Year	Title	Role
1949	White Heat	Cashier
1949	The Story of Seabiscuit	Nurse
1950	Rustlers on Horseback	Mrs. Jack Reynolds
1950	Chain Lightning	Pilot
1950	The Happy Years	Dolly Travers
1950	The Great Jewel Robber	Marian Blaine
1950	The Old Frontier	Betty Ames
1951	Night Riders of Montana	Julie Bauer
1952	Desperadoes' Outpost	Kathy
1953	Robot Monster	Alice
1955	A Life at Stake	Madge Neilan
1957	Chain of Evidence	Harriet Owens
1960	Seven Ways from Sundown	Gilda
1961	The Last Time I Saw Archie	Lola
1961	You Have to Run Fast	Fran
1962	Escape from Zahrain	Nurse
1964	Taggart	Lola Manners
