= Barbara Lang (film actress) =

American actress (1928–1982)

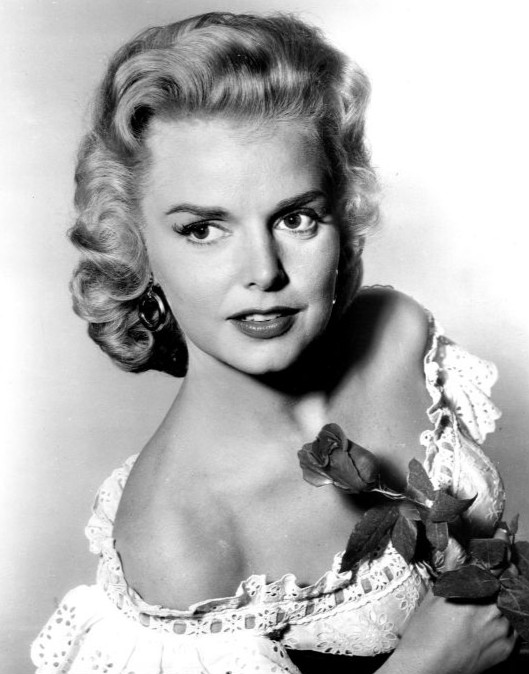
- Lang in 1958
- Born: Barbara Jean Bly; March 2, 1928
- Died: July 22, 1982 (aged 54)
- Years active: 1955–1981
- Spouse(s): David Everett Daniel (m. 1945; div. 1952) Alan Wells (m. 1956; ann. 1958) John George (m. 1967; div. 1972)
- Children: 2

Barbara Lang (born Barbara Jean Bly, March 2, 1928 – July 22, 1982) was an American actress and singer.

== Early life ==
Lang was born March 2, 1928. She studied dramatics during her time at Eagle Rock High School and also supplemented this with appearances in little theater.

After contracting poliomyelitis, Lang was told that she might never walk again. She turned to the Bible during this time and later regained her ability to walk, which she credited to her faith. Shortly after being stricken, her legs and facial muscles were paralyzed, and she had difficulty speaking. The lingering effect she experienced most was tiring easily.

Lang began singing in night clubs to pay her medical debts. She was a self-taught vocalist who trusted her accompanist to select each song's key and pitch. She eventually began singing regularly in Portland and San Francisco.

== Career ==
=== Film ===
She first came to the attention of Hollywood producers with appearances in six Death Valley Days episodes (1955–1956). In 1957, she signed a contract with Metro Goldwyn Mayer and was assigned to dramatic school. As a new star for MGM Lang played the female lead in House of Numbers (1957), co-starring with Jack Palance. It was filmed inside San Quentin Prison and in Mill Valley, California.

Lang was at first named to star opposite Elvis Presley in Jailhouse Rock. Before being cast the movie was tentatively entitled Jailhouse Kid. In the Joe Pasternak production of Party Girl (1958), Lang played "Ginger D'Amour", a Chicago showgirl of the 1930s.

=== Television ===
After surviving and recovering from polio, Lang went into television work. Her TV credits are numerous. She is in episodes of The Thin Man (1957), the episode "Escape to Tampico" of Maverick (1958), The Bob Cummings Show (1958), 77 Sunset Strip (1959), Lawman (1959), Tightrope! (1959), and Outlaws (1960), among others.

== Personal life ==
Lang married her first husband David Everett Daniel on August 9, 1945, in Los Angeles.

She married her second husband, actor Alan Wells, in Ensanada, Mexico in 1956. On August 18, 1958, Lang filed for an annulment on the grounds that Wells had married Lang before his divorce from actress Claudia Barrett was final. In November 1958, the decree was granted. Lang and Wells met when she played in Death Valley Days.

Lang married her third husband John George in 1967, who she later divorced in 1972.

== Death ==
Lang died at age 54 in on July 22, 1982, reportedly from pneumonia.

== Acting credits ==
- Death Valley Days (1955–56) 3 appearances
- Hot Summer Night (1957) (uncredited)
- House of Numbers (1957)
- The Thin Man (1957) 1 episode
- Maverick (1958) 1 episode
- Party Girl (1958)
- The Bob Cummings Show (1958) 1 episode
- 77 Sunset Strip (1959) 1 episode
- Lawman (1959) 4 episodes
- Tightrope! (1959) 1 episode
- Outlaws (1960) 1 episode
