= 302nd Tactical Missile Squadron =

Inactive US Air Force unit

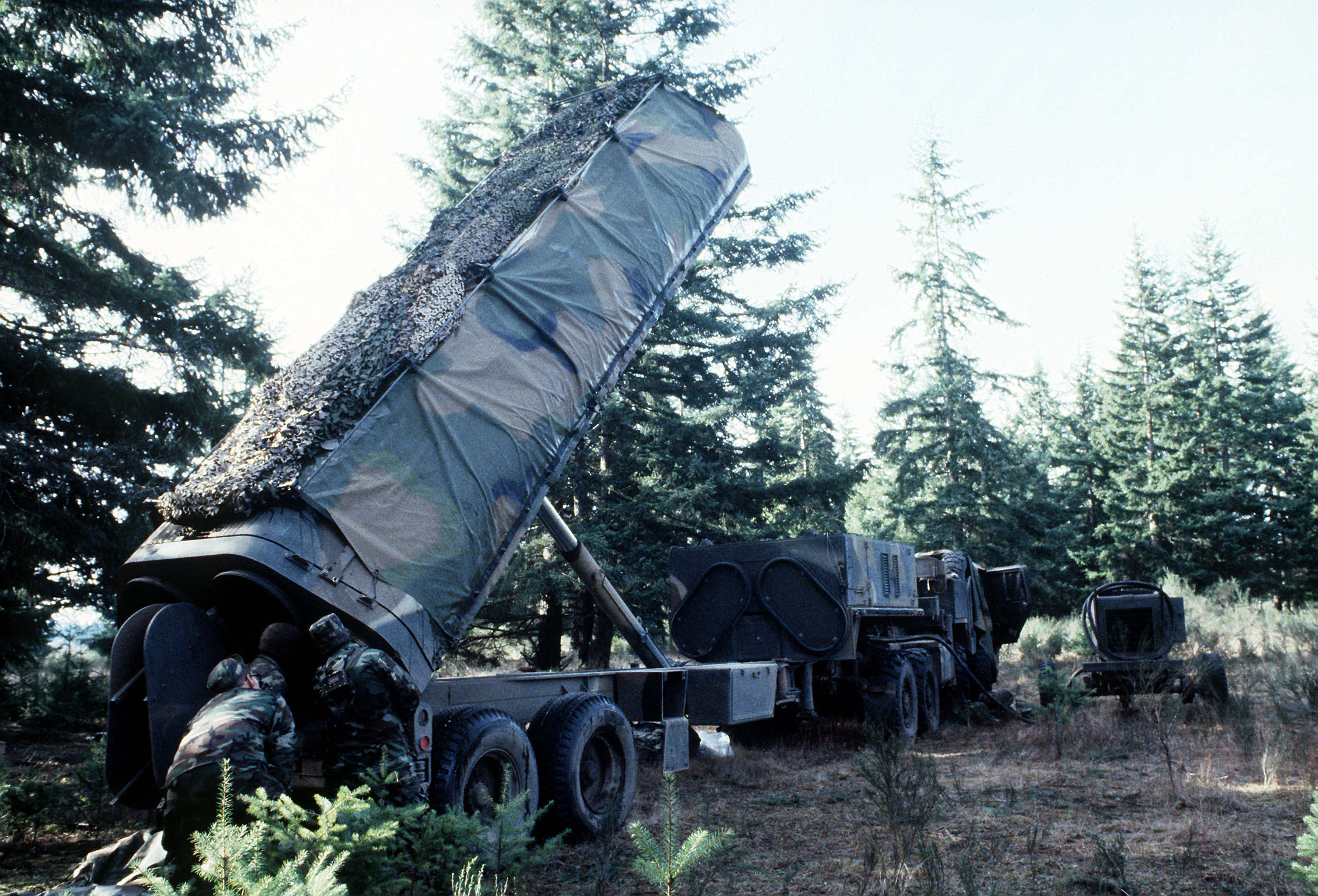
- BGM-109G Gryphon launcher
- Active: 1943–1946; 1953–1966; 1983–1991
- Country: United States
- Branch: United States Air Force
- Role: Cruise Missile
- Nickname: Black Panthers (World War II) Falcons (1953–1958)
- Motto: First to Disperse (1986–present)
- Engagements: Southwest Pacific Theater
- Decorations: Distinguished Unit Citation; Air Force Outstanding Unit Award; Philippine Presidential Unit Citation

Insignia
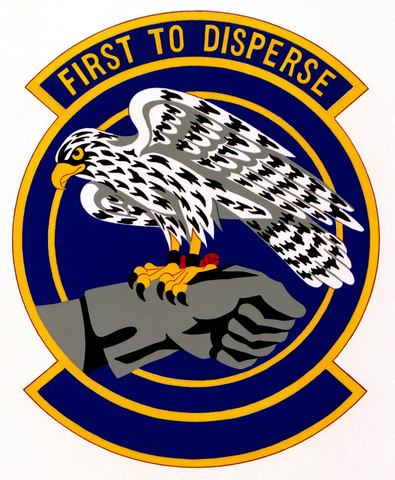
- 302nd Tactical Missile Squadron emblem (Note: Approved c. February 1986.)

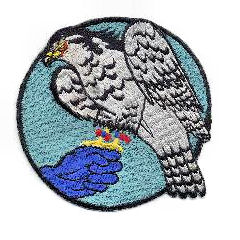
- Patch with 822nd Bombardment Squadron emblem (Note: Approved 17 June 1954. Description: On and over a sky blue disc, a black falcon with red bells, perched on a black gloved fist issuant from base.)

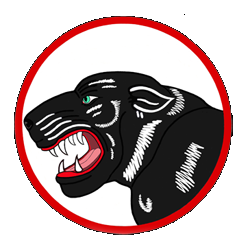
- 822d Bombardment Squadron emblem (World War II)

The 302nd Tactical Missile Squadron is an inactive United States Air Force unit. Its last assignment was with the 487th Tactical Missile Wing at Comiso Air Station, Italy, where it was inactivated in 1991 with the implementation of the Intermediate Range Nuclear Forces Treaty.

The squadron was first activated in 1943 as the 822nd Bombardment Squadron. After training, it moved to the Southwest Pacific Theater, where it flew North American B-25 Mitchell medium bombers in combat. The squadron was awarded a Distinguished Unit Citation and a Philippine Presidential Unit Citation for its actions. In late 1945, the squadron moved to Japan, where it became part of the occupation forces before inactivating in the spring of 1946.

The squadron was reactivated in France 1953, when it replaced an Air National Guard squadron that had been mobilized for the Korean War. In 1958, the Air Force withdrew its tactical bombers from Europe but the squadron remained active as the 822nd Tactical Missile Squadron when it replaced the 11th Tactical Missile Squadron at Sembach Air Base. It operated MGM-1 Matador and MGM-13 Mace missiles at Sembach until inactivating in 1966. The squadron was again activated in 1983 as the 302nd Tactical Missile Squadron when the Air Force deployed BGM-109G Gryphon cruise missiles to Europe.

== History ==
=== World War II ===
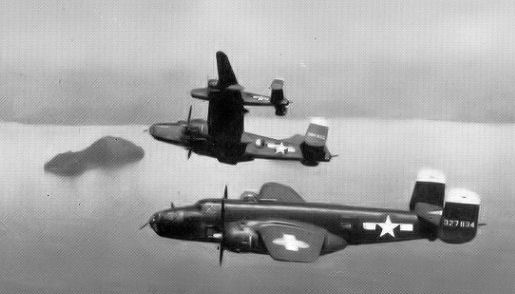
38th Bombardment Group B-25s

The squadron was first activated in April 1943 in Australia as the 822nd Bombardment Squadron, a North American B-25 Mitchell medium bomber squadron, along with the 823d Bombardment Squadron. The 822nd and 823d squadrons were organized to replace the 69th and 70th Bombardment Squadrons, which had been transferred from the 38th Bombardment Group to the 42nd Bombardment Group in February.

After equipping, the 822nd moved to New Guinea, where it joined the other elements of the 38th Group. It flew bombardment missions against Japanese shipping and airfields. The 822nd was awarded a Distinguished Unit Citation (DUC) for bombing and strafing Japanese troops and fortifications located on New Britain's Cape Gloucester to prepare for an amphibious attack on the island in December 1943. It earned a second DUC for attacks on Japanese ships and airfields on 16 and 17 June 1944.

The 822nd moved to the Molucca Islands in November and attacked targets in the Philippines to prepare for the American attack on Leyte. In November it struck a large enemy convoy in Ormoc Bay, preventing Japanese reinforcements from reaching the battle area, for which it was awarded its third DUC. After moving to the Philippines, it continued to support ground forces fighting there, while also flying missions along the Chinese coast and to Formosa.

It moved to Okinawa in July 1945 and conducted several missions against southern Japan before VJ Day. In November it moved to Japan and briefly became part of the occupation forces until inactivating there in April 1946.

=== Reactivation in Europe ===
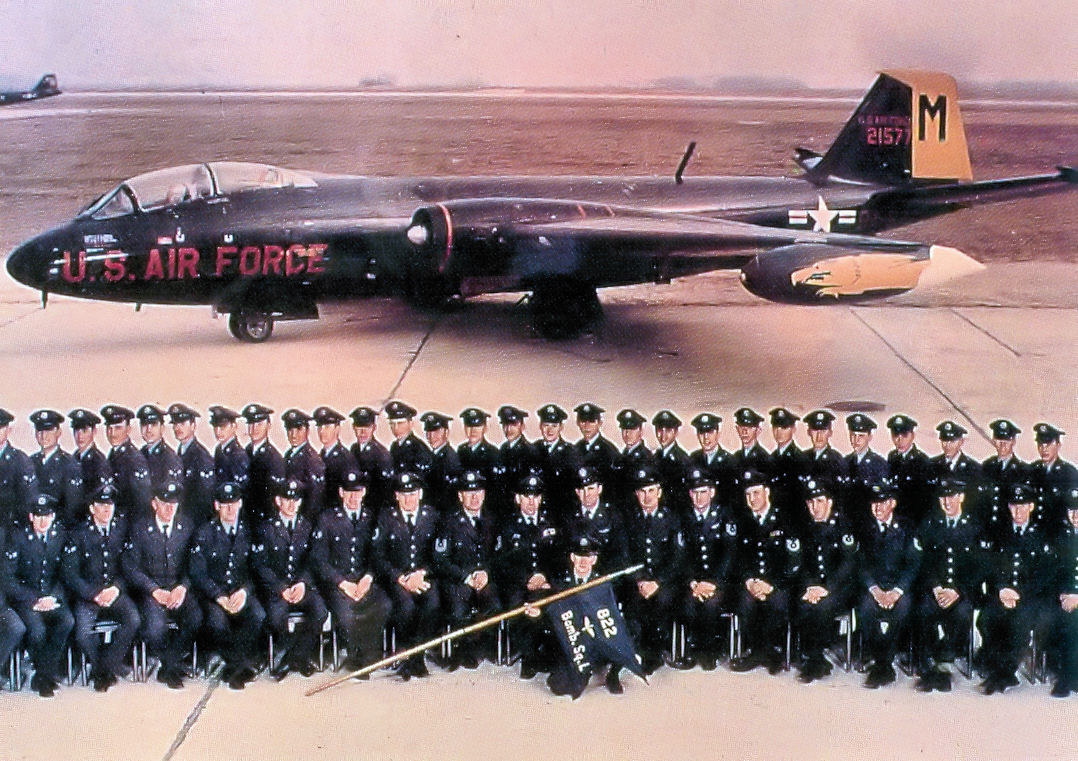
822nd Bombardment Squadron members with unit B-57B. (Note: Aircraft is Martin B-57B-MA Canberra, serial 52-1577) This plane was sent to the Military Aircraft Storage and Disposition Centre on 22 July 1960 and salvaged on 16 November 1960. Photo taken in 1956.

The 822nd was reactivated at Laon-Couvron Air Base, France on 1 January 1953. It assumed the mission, personnel and Douglas B-26 Invader light bombers of the 180th Bombardment Squadron, a Missouri Air National Guard squadron that had been mobilized for the Korean War, but was being returned to State control at the end of its active duty tour. Over the next two years, the squadron completed an upgrade of its Invader force to planes equipped for night intruder missions. As facilities at Laon were completed, it was able to move from tents to permanent buildings.

In January 1955, the squadron's pilots began flying missions in jet Lockheed T-33 T-Birds to prepare them for conversion to Martin B-57B Canberras. It would not be until the end of the year before the first B-57Cs, equipped with dual controls were on hand, so for some squadron pilots, their first solo in the Canberra was also their first flight in the bomber. In July 1955, the squadron's mission was changed from night intruder missions to the delivery of nuclear weapons.

Starting in January 1956, the squadron, along with the other squadrons of the 38th Wing, began to rotate aircrews and aircraft to Landstuhl Air Base, where they stood alert with nuclear weapons (called Zulu Alert). The squadron also participated in the wing's maintenance of twelve aircraft on alert at its home station. To maintain efficiency in its operational mission, the squadron deployed to Wheelus Air Base, Libya for gunnery and bombing practice. In December 1957, the 38th Bombardment Wing converted to the dual deputy organization. The 38th Bombardment Group was inactivated and the squadron was assigned directly to wing headquarters.

At the start of 1958, the squadron began transferring its B-57s back to the United States. By 18 June, the squadron's operations at Laon had ceased.

=== Conversion to missile unit ===
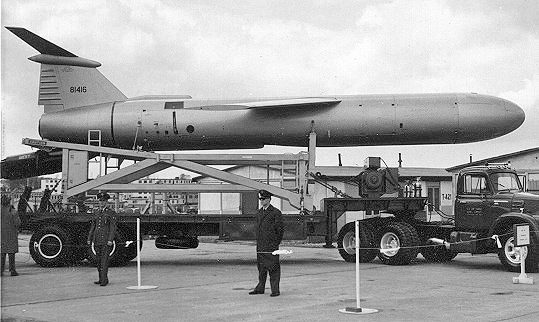
38th Tactical Missile Wing Mace missile (Note: Missile is Martin TM-76B Mace, serial 58-1415.)

The end of the B-57 bomber mission in Europe did not, however, result in the inactivation of the squadron. On 18 June, the 38th Wing moved to Germany, where it replaced the 701st Tactical Missile Wing. The 822nd moved on paper to Sembach Air Base, where it became the 822nd Tactical Missile Squadron and assumed the mission, personnel and Martin TM-61 Matador missiles of the 11th Tactical Missile Squadron, which was simultaneously inactivated. The wing's squadrons were dispersed among several bases in Germany, and the squadron was assigned to the missile group at Sembach, the 587th Tactical Missile Group.

The wing's missiles at Sembach were located at three remote missile launch sites. The squadron operated Site I "Chargirl", which was located 2.6 miles (4.2 km) SSW of Sembach AB 49°28′16″N 007°50′56″E, near Mehlingen. It was redeveloped into a training facility of the local Kaiserslautern soccer club. The launch pads have been completely overbuilt with soccer fields.

In September 1962, the 38th Wing reorganized, eliminating its groups. As a result, the squadron was now assigned directly to the 38th Tactical Missile Wing. At the same time, the wing completed its upgrade from Matadors to the TM-76 Mace missile. The Mace was a development of the Matador, with an internal guidance system. This reorganization included the activation of two additional squadrons at Sembach, the 823rd and 887th Tactical Missile Squadrons, which took over the operation of Sites 2 and 3 from the 822d.

It then remained as a tactical missile unit until 1966 when the A model of the Mace was retired and the last missiles were shipped to Eglin Air Force Base. Florida to be used as targets. (Note: One squadron of the 38th Wing, the 71st Tactical Missile Squadron, operated the B model of the Mace with an inertial guidance system and longer range, and remained active.)

=== Ground launched cruise missiles ===
The squadron was redesignated the 302nd Tactical Missile Squadron and again activated in July 1983 at Comiso Air Station and assigned to the 487th Tactical Missile Wing, the second operational BGM-109G Gryphon cruise missile wing to activate. Almost as soon as the Gryphons deployed in Europe, protests erupted against them, but Comiso was located on Sicily, far from the large population centers of Italy and was largely exempt from these demonstrations.

By the time the Gryphons were fully deployed in 1987, talks between the United States and the Soviet Union had begun that led to the signing of the Intermediate Range Nuclear Forces Treaty, banning the missiles from Europe. The last missiles were gone by May 1991, and the squadron inactivated on the 27th of that month.

== Lineage ==
- Constituted as the 822nd Bombardment Squadron (Medium) on 29 March 1943

Activated on 20 April 1943
Redesignated 822nd Bombardment Squadron, Medium in 1944
Inactivated on 12 April 1946

- Redesignated 822nd Bombardment Squadron, Light on 15 November 1952

Activated on 1 January 1953
Redesignated 822nd Bombardment Squadron, Tactical on 1 October 1955
Redesignated 822nd Tactical Missile Squadron on 18 June 1958
Inactivated on 25 September 1966

- Redesignated 302nd Tactical Missile Squadron on 11 January 1982

Activated on 1 July 1983
Inactivated 27 May 1991

=== Assignments ===
- 38th Bombardment Group, 20 April 1943 – 12 April 1946
- 38th Bombardment Group, 1 January 1953
- 38th Bombardment Wing, 8 December 1957
- 587th Tactical Missile Group, 18 June 1958
- 38th Tactical Missile Wing, 25 September 1962 – 25 September 1966
- 487th Tactical Missile Wing, 1 July 1983 – 27 May 1991

=== Stations ===
- Amberley Field, Queensland, Australia, 20 April 1943
- Durand Airfield, Port Moresby, New Guinea, c. 20 June 1943
- Nadzab Airfield Complex, New Guinea, 8 March 1944
- Mokmer Airfield, Biak, Schouten Islands, Netherlands East Indies, 25 August 1944
- Pitroe Airfield, Morotai, Netherlands East Indies, 6 November 1944
- Lingayen Airfield, Luzon, Philippines, 20 January 1945
- Motobu Airfield, Okinawa, 25 July 1945
- Itazuke Airfield, Japan, 22 November 1945 – 12 April 1946
- Laon-Couvron Air Base, France, 1 January 1953
- Sembach Air Base, Germany, 18 June 1958 – 25 September 1966
- Comiso Air Station, 1 July 1983 – 27 May 1991

=== Aircraft and missiles ===
- North American B-25 Mitchell, 1943–1946
- Douglas B-26 Invader, 1953–1955
- Martin B-57 Canberra, 1955–1958
- Martin TM-61 (later MGM-1) Matador, 1958–1960
- Martin TM-76A (later MGM-13A) Mace, 1961–1966
- BGM-109G Gryphon, 1983–1991

== See also ==
- List of United States Air Force missile squadrons
- List of B-57 units of the United States Air Force
- List of A-26 Invader operators
