= 38th Combat Support Wing =

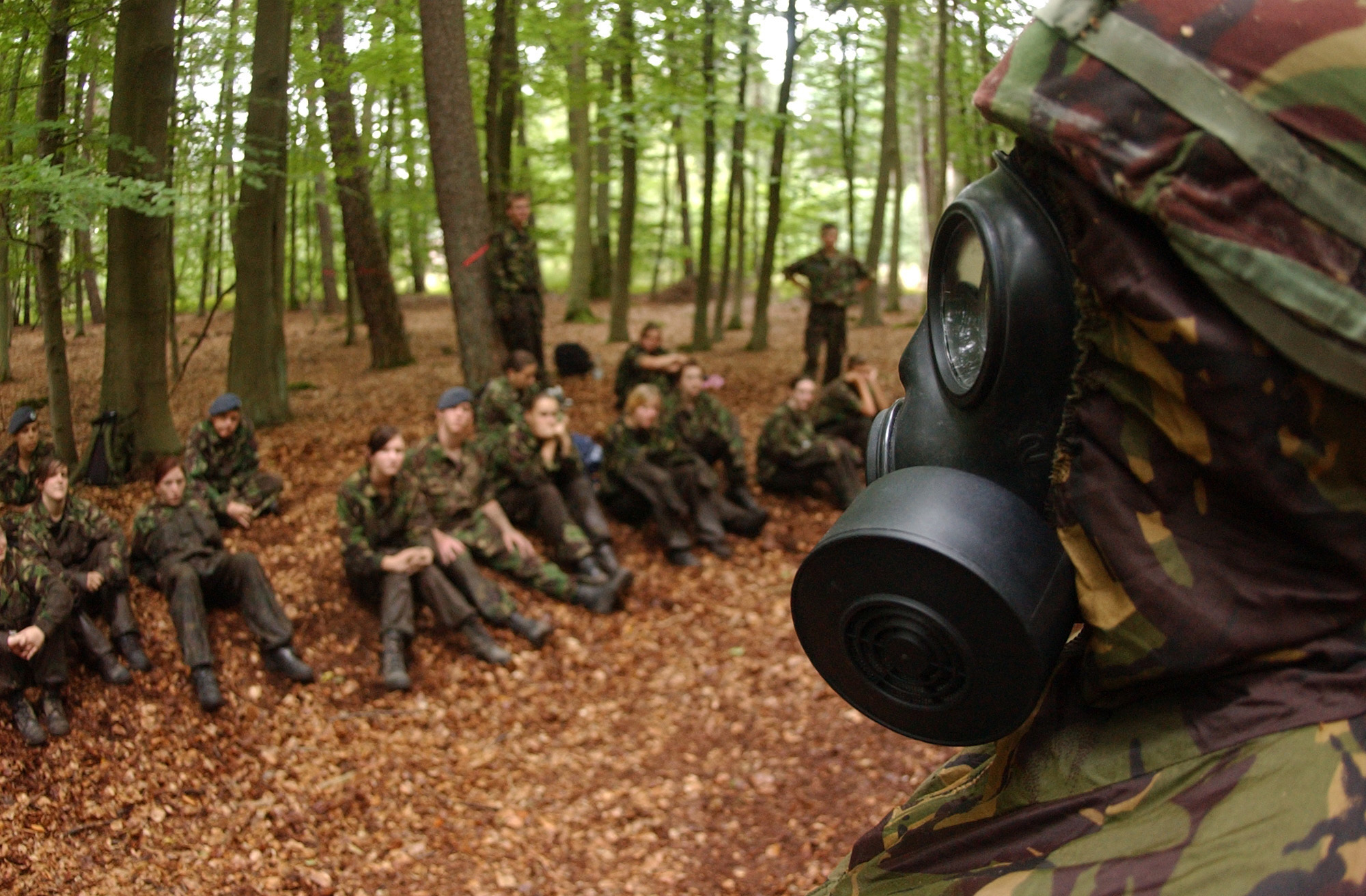
- Royal Air Force cadets training with the wing's 38th Construction & Training Squadron
- Active: 1948–1949; 1953–1966; 1973–1975; 1985–1990; 1994–2000; 2004–2007
- Country: United States
- Branch: United States Air Force
- Role: Central support of dispersed units
- Decorations: Air Force Outstanding Unit Award

Insignia
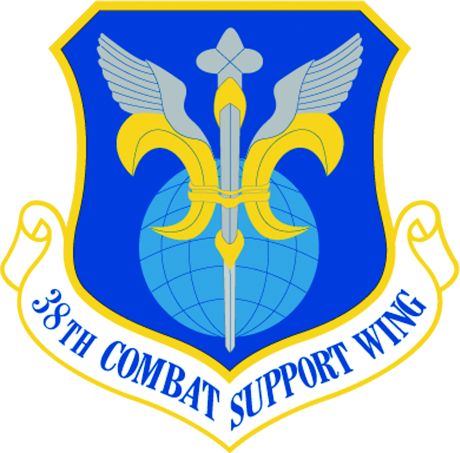
- 38th Combat Support Wing emblem (Note: Approved 4 November 2004.)

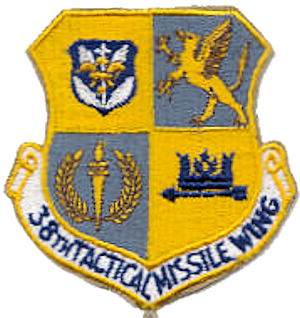
- Patch with 38th Tactical Missile Wing emblem (Note: Approved 11 December 1958.)

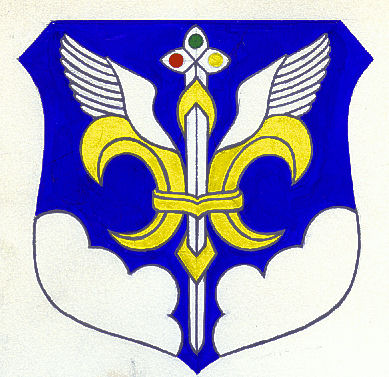
- 38th Bombardment Wing emblem (Note: Approved 16 April 1954.)

The 38th Combat Support Wing is an inactive wing of the United States Air Force. Its last assignment was with Third Air Force at Ramstein Air Base, Germany from 2004 until 2007. The mission of the wing was to enhance support to Third Air Force's geographically separated units.

The Wing was first activated in Japan in 1948 as the 38th Bombardment Wing, carrying on the history of the 38th Bombardment Group, which was one of the first Army Air Forces units to operate in the Pacific Theater after Pearl Harbor. The wing served as a light bomber unit in Japan until 1949, when it was inactivated. It was activated again in Europe in 1953.

In 1958, the wing became the 38th Tactical Missile Wing and controlled Martin TM-61 Matador and Martin MGM-13 Mace missile units in Germany until it was inactivated in 1966.

Between 1972 and 1975 the wing was twice active as a flying training unit. It returned to the tactical missile mission in Europe until its missiles were withdrawn following the signing of the Intermediate-Range Nuclear Forces Treaty. From 1990 to 1994, as the 38th Engineering Installation Wing it was responsible for the Air Force's in house design and installation of electronic equipment.

== History ==
The 38th Bombardment Group was first established in 1940. It was one of the first Army Air Forces units to operate in the South West Pacific Area after Pearl Harbor. Its first aircraft arrived in New Caledonia in June 1942, but two of the group's aircraft had already taken part in the Battle of Midway. When the 38th Bombardment Wing was established in 1948, the wing was temporarily authorized to display the honors earned by the group prior to 14 August 1948.

=== Light bomber operations ===
==== Far East Air Forces ====
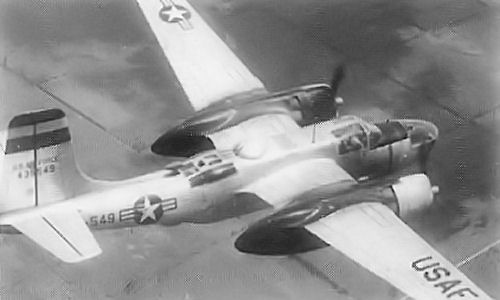
822d Bomb Sq B-26C Invader (Note: Aircraft is Douglas B-26C-35-DT Invader serial 44-35549.)

The unit was first established at Itami Airfield, Japan as the 38th Bombardment Wing, Light on 10 August 1948 when Far East Air Forces reorganized its units under the "Hobson Plan" wing base reorganization, in which combat groups and all supporting units on a base were assigned to a single wing. The 38th Bombardment Group, flying Douglas B-26 Invaders became its operational component. The wing assisted in the air defense of Japan and participated in tactical exercises. However, President Truman’s reduced 1949 defense budget required reductions in the number of combat units in the Air Force to 48, and the 38th was inactivated on 1 April 1949.

==== United States Air Forces in Europe ====
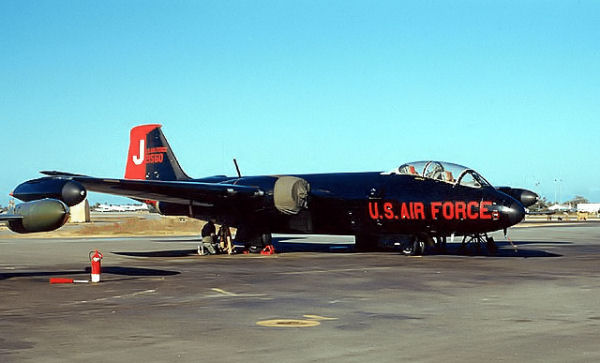
71st Bomb Sq Martin B-57B (Note: Aircraft is Martin B-57B serial 52-1560 in 1957. This aircraft was one of the "Black Knights" aerial acrobatic team. After its withdrawal from France in 1958, this aircraft was eventually assigned to the 8th Bombardment Squadron at Phan Rang Air Base South Vietnam and flew combat bombing missions into the late 1960s.)

The wing was reactivated on 1 January 1953 at Laon-Couvron Air Base, France, where it assumed the mission, personnel and equipment of the 126th Bombardment Wing, an Illinois Air National Guard unit that had been mobilized during the Korean War and was being returned to state control. Once again, the wing flew the Douglas B-26 Invader as its operational aircraft. The wing received its first Martin B-57B Canberra in June 1955, and began to replace its aging Douglas B-26 Invaders. With the B-57's arrival, the B-26s were returned to the United States. A total of 49 B-57B and eight dual control B-57C models were deployed to Laon.

The mission of the B-57 was to provide a nuclear deterrent for NATO and to deliver nuclear weapons against pre-selected targets, day or night. The aircraft at Laon were painted a gloss black. The B-57 delivery was by the low altitude bombing system, in which the plane performed a vertical Immelmann turn, releasing the weapon when it was nearly vertical. An acrobatic team was organized and named the Black Knights using five B-57s. The Black Knights performed at several air shows around Western Europe, including the 1957 Paris Air Show. The Black Knights were the only tactical bomber show team in the world. In 1958, President de Gaulle announced that all nuclear weapons and delivery aircraft had to be removed from French soil by July 1958. This meant all tactical fighter and bombing wings had to depart France.

=== First theater missile operations ===
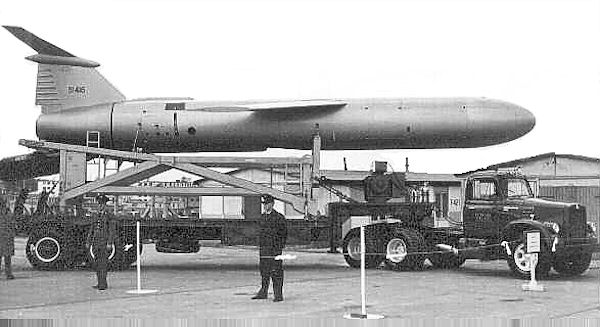
A Mace missile at Bitburg AB

Although the wing's bombers departed Europe, the 38th did not go with them. Instead, it became the 38th Tactical Missile Wing and moved on paper to Hahn Air Base West Germany, where it replaced the 701st Tactical Missile Wing, which had been at Hahn since the fall of 1956. The wing assumed the operation of the 701st's Martin TM-61 Matador missiles, located on three bases in Germany. A little more than a year later, the wing moved its headquarters to Sembach Air Base, Germany. The wing later upgraded to the improved version of the Matador, the Martin TM-76 Mace. When the Mace was phased out of the inventory, te wing was inactivated in September 1966.

=== Pilot training ===
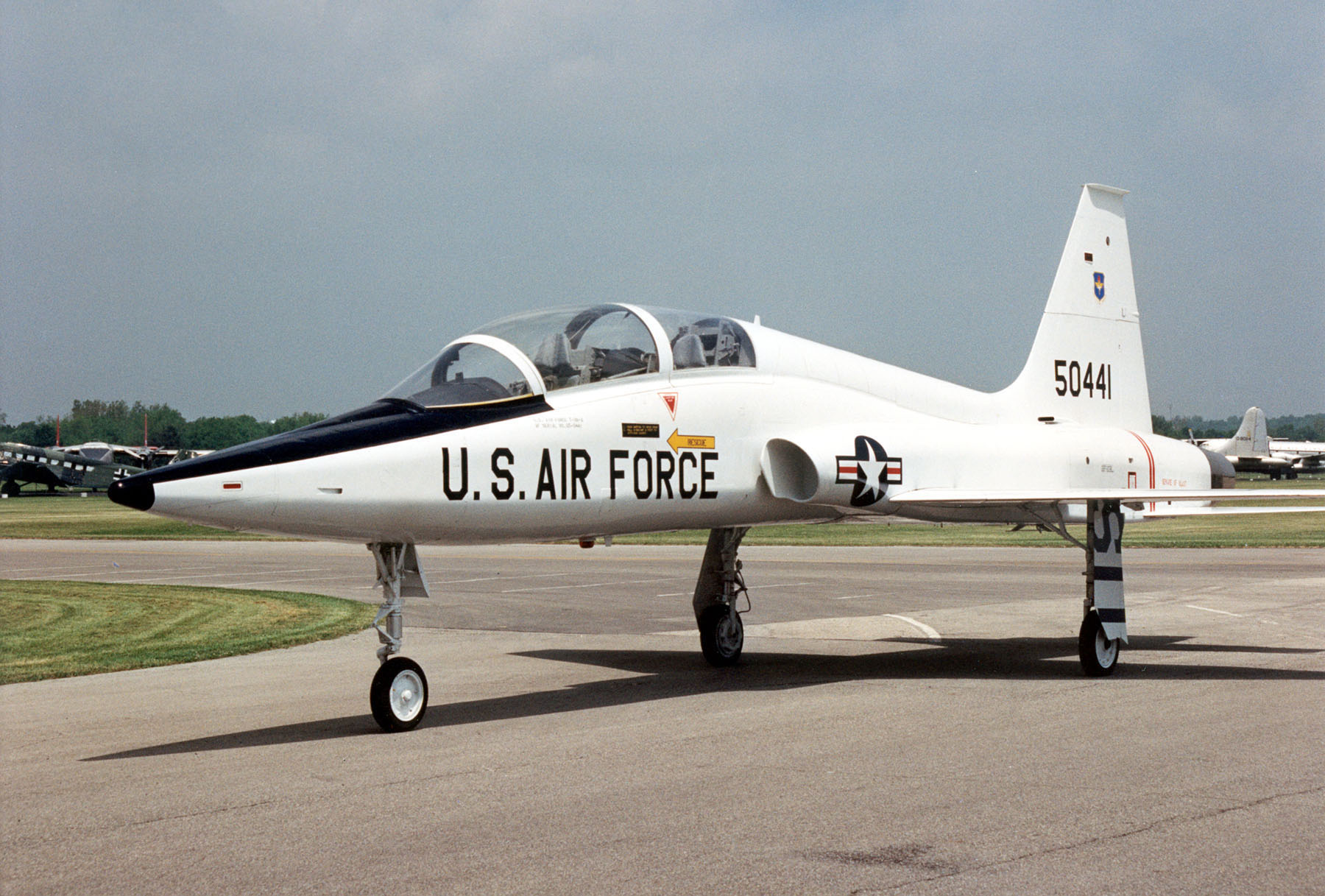
T-38 Talon advanced trainer

In 1972, Air Training Command (ATC) replaced its Major Command controlled flying training units with Air Force controlled units. As part of this program, The 38th was reactivated as the 38th Flying Training Wing and replaced the 3640th Pilot Training Wing at Laredo Air Force Base, Texas on 1 August 1972. Its operational squadrons were the 70th and 71st Flying Training Squadrons. However, Laredo was marked for closure as Air Force pilot training requirements were reduced with the winding down of the War in Vietnam. The wing ended its pilot training on 28 August 1973, when it was inactivated.

ATC's unit replacement program was continuing, however, and on 1 December 1973, the wing replaced another Major Command wing, the 3550th Pilot Training Wing, at Moody Air Force Base, Georgia. The 38th performed pilot training until 21 November 1975, when preparations to transfer Moody to Tactical Air Command were completed. On 1 December 1975 the 347th Tactical Fighter Wing moved to Moody from Korat Royal Thai Air Force Base, Thailand and the mission of the base changed from pilot training to a tactical fighter operations. The 38th FTW was inactivated on 1 December 1975, with the personnel and equipment of its support units transferring to the 347th Wing.

=== Return to theater missile operations ===
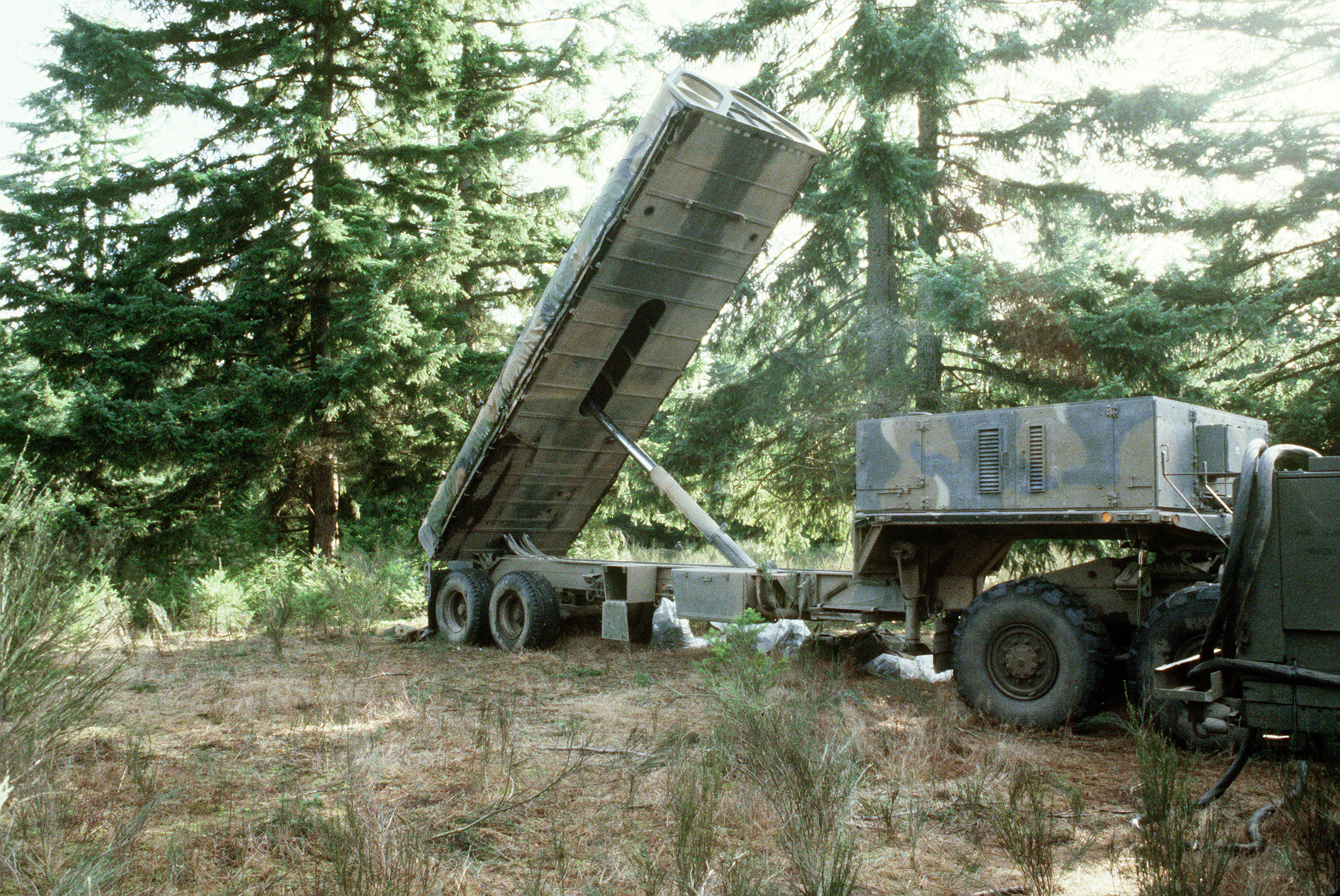
BGM-109G Gryphon missile

In April 1985, the 38th Tactical Missile Wing, was activated at Wüschheim Air Station, West Germany. The wing was assigned to tactical missile operations, equipped with Ground-Launched Cruise Missiles (GLCM) to counter Soviet intermediate-range ballistic missiles from 1986–1990. The GLCMs (and their strategic cousins, the Pershing IIs) were deployed, in part, to balance/counter the deployment of the Soviet RSD-10 'Pioner' (SS-20) IRBM.

It was this realization that led to the opening of the Intermediate-range Nuclear Forces (INF) talks and an INF treaty that eventually removed an entire class of nuclear arms from the superpower arsenals. The Intermediate-Range Nuclear Forces Treaty with the Soviet Union which went into effect on 1 June 1988, led to inactivation of the wing on 22 August 1990.

During its time at Wüschheim Air Station, the 38 TMW was not configured as a separate, self-sustaining wing. It consisted of missile operations, missile maintenance and missile security but it did not have its own support units, such as finance, personnel, civil engineering, etc. Instead, support units within the nearby 50th Tactical Fighter Wing at Hahn Air Base were augmented with additional personnel to provide support to the 38th.

=== Electronics engineering ===
The 38th was activated again at Tinker Air Force Base, Oklahoma in November 1994 as the 38th Engineering Installation Wing, to provide the Air Force with centralized management of worldwide electronics engineering and installation resources. The wing replaced the Communications Systems Center and absorbed its personnel and equipment, and reported to the Electronic Systems Center. The wing was inactivated in February 2000 and its functions were transferred to its subordinate 38th Engineering Installation Group at Tinker.

=== Base support services ===
The wing was again activated as the 38th Combat Support Wing at Ramstein Air Base, Germany in May 2004 to support over 70 USAFE geographically separated units cross Europe. But a review found the wing actually created an extra layer of bureaucracy and isolated units would be better served without it. Also studies showed that larger, neighboring bases could offer better support for airmen scattered across the continent. The wing was inactivated on 30 September 2007.

== Lineage ==
- Constituted as the 38th Bombardment Wing, Light on 10 August 1948

Activated on 18 August 1948
Inactivated on 1 April 1949

- Activated on 1 January 1953

Redesignated 38th Bombardment Wing, Tactical on 1 October 1955
Redesignated 38th Tactical Missile Wing on 18 June 1958
Discontinued and inactivated on 25 September 1966

- Redesignated 38th Flying Training Wing on 22 March 1972

Activated on 1 August 1972
Inactivated on 30 September 1973

- Activated on 1 December 1973

Inactivated on 1 December 1975

- Redesignated 38th Tactical Missile Wing on 4 December 1984

Activated on 1 April 1985
Inactivated on 22 August 1990

- Redesignated 38th Engineering Installation Wing on 1 November 1994

Activated on 8 November 1994
Inactivated on 3 February 2000

- Redesignated 38th Combat Support Wing on 19 April 2004

Activated on 25 May 2004
Inactivated on 1 May 2007

=== Assignments ===
- 315th Air Division, 10 August 1948 – 1 April 1949
- Twelfth Air Force, 1 January 1953
- United States Air Forces in Europe, 1 January 1958
- Seventeenth Air Force, 15 November 1959 – 25 September 1966
- Air Training Command, 1 August 1972 – 30 September 1973; 1 December 1973 – 1 December 1975
- Seventeenth Air Force, 1 April 1985 – 22 August 1990
- Electronic Systems Center, 8 November 1994 – 3 February 2000
- Third Air Force, 25 May 2004
- United States Air Forces in Europe, 1 November 2005
- Air Command Europe, 18 November 2005
- Third Air Force, 1 December 2006 – 11 September 2007

=== Components ===
Groups

- 38th Bombardment Group, 18 August 1948 – 1 April 1949; 1 January 1953 – 8 December 1957
- 585th Tactical Missile Group, 18 June 1958 – 25 September 1962

Bitburg Air Base, West Germany

- 586th Tactical Missile Group, 18 June 1958 – 25 September 1962

Hahn Air Base, West Germany

- 587th Tactical Missile Group, 18 June 1958 – 25 September 1962

Sembach Air Base, West Germany

Squadrons

- 38th Tactical Missile Maintenance Squadron: 1 April 1985 – 22 August 1990
- 70th Flying Training Squadron: 1 August 1972 – 30 September 1973; 1 December 1973 – 1 December 1975
- 71st Bombardment Squadron (later 71st Tactical Missile Squadron, 71st Flying Training Squadron): 18 August 1948 – 1 April 1949; 1 January 1953 – 18 June 1958; 25 September 1962 – 1 October 1965; 1 August 1972 – 30 September 1973; 1 December 1973 – 1 December 1975
- 89th Bombardment Squadron (later 89th Tactical Missile Squadron):18 August 1948 – 1 April 1949; 25 September 1962 – 25 September 1966; 1 April 1985 – 22 August 1990
- 405th Bombardment Squadron (Later Tactical Missile Squadron): 18 August 1948 – 1 April 1949; 1 January 1953 – 18 June 1958; 25 September 1962 – 25 September 1966
- 822d Bombardment Squadron (Later 822d Tactical Missile Squadron): 1 January 1953 – 18 June 1958; 25 September 1962 – 25 September 1966
- 823d Bombardment Squadron (Later 823d Tactical Missile Squadron): 25 September 1962 – 25 September 1966
- 887th Tactical Missile Squadron: 25 September 1962 – 25 September 1966

=== Stations ===
- Itami Airfield, 18 August 1948 – 1 April 1949
- Laon-Couvron Air Base, France, 1 January 1953
- Hahn Air Base, Germany, 18 June 1958
- Sembach Air Base, Germany, 20 August 1959 – 25 September 1966
- Laredo Air Force Base, Texas, 1 August 1972 – 30 September 1973
- Moody Air Force Base, Georgia, 1 December 1973 – 1 December 1975
- Wüschheim Air Station, West Germany, 1 April 1985 – 22 August 1990
- Tinker Air Force Base, Oklahoma, 8 November 1994 – 3 February 2000
- Ramstein Air Base, Germany, 25 May 2004 – 11 September 2007

==== Dispersed missile locations ====
Between 1958–1966, the 38th TMW maintained eight separate launch facilities.

- Site I "Chargirl" – 2.6 miles (4.2 km) SSW of Sembach Air Base (822d TMS/587th TMG) 49°28′16″N 007°50′56″E

Closed 1966. Redeveloped into a training facility of the local Kaiserslautern soccer club. The launch pads have been completely overbuilt with soccer fields

- Site II "Invent" – 3.0 miles (4.8 km) SSE of Sembach Air Base (823d TMS/587th TMG) 49°28′06″N 007°53′53″E

Closed 1966, Abandoned state, buildings in various states of deterioration, missile shelters removed, concrete pads remain.

- Site III "Hacksaw" – 12.5 miles (20.1 km) ENE of Sembach Air Base (887th TMS/587th TMG) 49°33′27″N 008°08′05″E

1975–1985 The site was used by Detachment B, 502nd Army Security Agency Battalion for the Guardrail I, II, and IIa Integrated Processing Facility. In 1979 the site was upgraded to the Guardrail V, and in the fall of 1985 moved to Echterdingen Army Airfield. It was later used by deployed communications units before being closed and turned over to German government.

- Site IV "Veronica" – 7.0 miles (11.3 km) ENE of Hahn Air Base (89th TMS/586th TMG) 49°59′58″N 007°23′58″E

Closed since 1967. Missile shelters torn down, in very dilapidated state, appears to be used as a storage yard.

- Site V "Pot Fuse" – 7.0 miles (11.3 km) ESE of Hahn Air Base (405th TMS/586th TMG) 49°54′48″N 007°24′46″E

Abandoned since 1961. Shelters torn down, site very obscured by trees and other vegetation in thick woodland area.

- Site VI "Heroin" – 9.7 miles (15.6 km) NE of Hahn Air Base (405th TMS/586th TMG) 50°02′37″N 007°25′32″E

Transferred to US Army and converted into a Nike-Hercules Air Defense missile site; operational 1970–1979. The area was transferred back to USAF in 1982 as Wueschheim Air Station.

- Site VII "B" Pad – 3.5 miles (5.6 km) NW of Bitburg Air Base (1st/71st TMS/585th TMG) 49°59′05″N 006°28′50″E

Underground concrete launch facility, closed 1960. Largely overgrown abandoned condition.

- Site VIII "C" Pad – 4.5 miles (7.2 km) SSW of Bitburg Air Base (1st/71st TMS/585th TMG) 49°53′21″N 006°33′30″E

Underground concrete launch facility. After closure the site was transferred to the Bundeswehr and converted into a Patriot missile site; closed 2001 now abandoned and overgrown with vegetation.

- Missile Support Area – 2.6 miles (4.2 km) SSW of Bitburg Air Base 49°58′11″N 006°28′27″E

BGM-109G Missile site located at: Site VI Heroin 9.7 miles (15.6 km) NE of Hahn Air Base

=== Aircraft and missiles ===
- Douglas A-26 (later B-26) Invader (1948–1949, 1953–1955)
- Martin B-57 Canberra (1955–1958)
- Martin TM-61 (later MGM-1) Matador (1958–1962)
- Marin TM-76 (later MGM-130 Mace (1960–1966)
- T-37 (1972–1975)
- T-38 Talon (1972–1975)
- BGM-109G Gryphon (1986–1990)

== See also ==
- List of BGM-109G GLCM Units
