= Beirne Lay Jr. =

American writer and combat veteran (1909–1982)

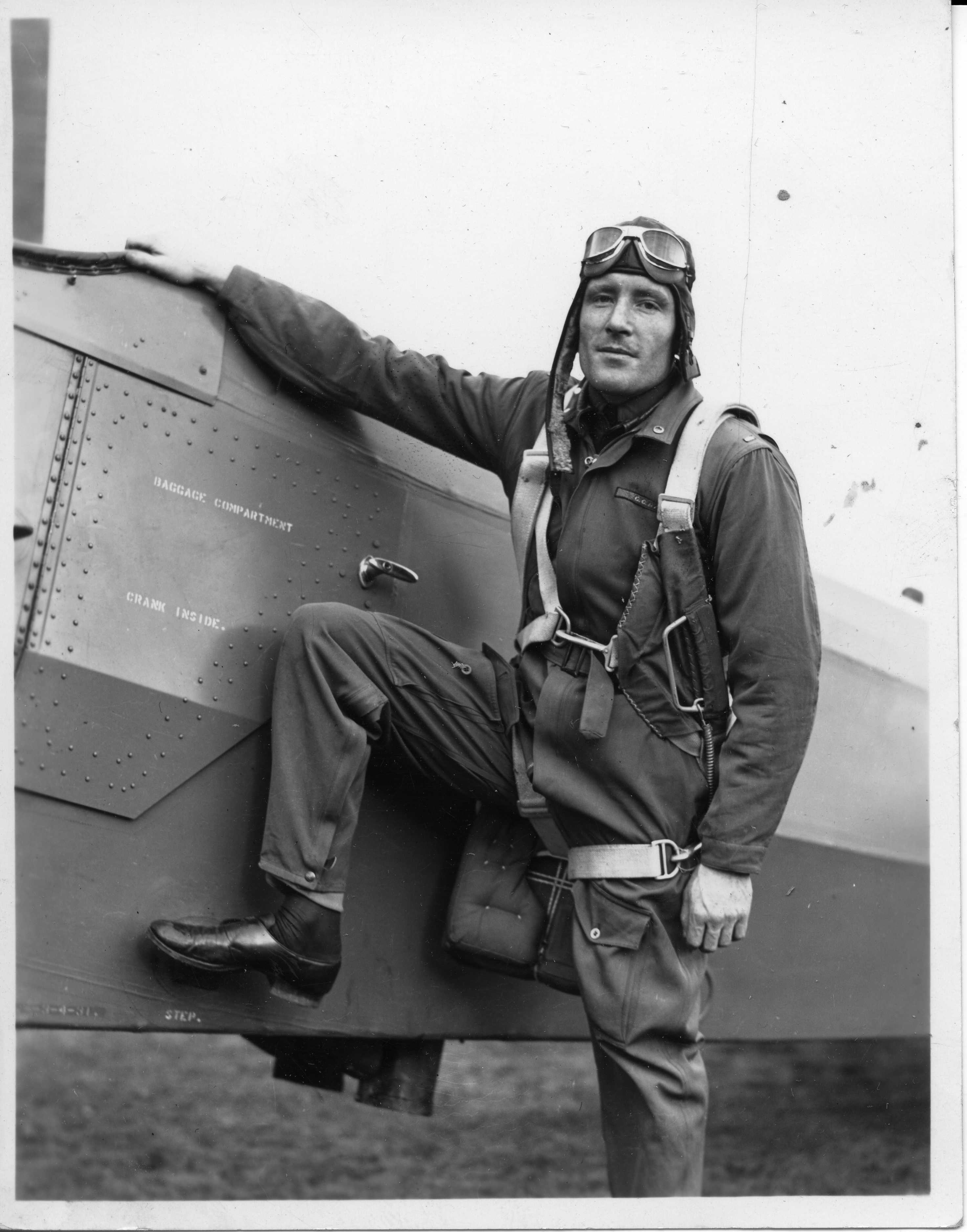
- Beirne Lay Jr. during USAAC flight training
- Born: September 1, 1909; Berkeley Springs, West Virginia, U.S.
- Died: May 26, 1982 (aged 72); Westwood, Los Angeles, California, U.S.
- Education: St. Paul's School
- Alma mater: Yale University
- Occupation: Writer
- Known for: Twelve O'Clock High
- Spouse: Philippa (née Ludwell)
- Children: 2
- Military career
- Allegiance: United States
- Branch: United States Army Air Corps; United States Army Air Forces
- Service years: 1932–1935, 1939–1946
- Rank: Colonel
- Service number: O-309771
- Unit: Eighth Air Force
- Commands: 487th Bombardment Group
- Conflicts: World War II
- Awards: Distinguished Flying Cross; Air Medal

Beirne Lay Jr. (September 1, 1909 – May 26, 1982) was an American writer, aviation writer, Hollywood screenwriter, and combat veteran of World War II with the U.S. Army Air Forces. He is best known for his collaboration with Sy Bartlett in authoring the novel Twelve O'Clock High and adapting it into a major film of the same name.

== Early life ==
Born September 1, 1909, in Berkeley Springs, West Virginia, Lay attended St. Paul's School in Concord, New Hampshire, and Yale University, graduating with a Bachelor of Arts degree in English in 1931. As an undergraduate, he boxed and rowed.

== Early military career ==
Lay enlisted in the U.S. Army Air Corps in July 1932, (Note: There are also documents indicating that Lay had joined the Volunteer Marine Corps Reserve as a student pilot in June 1931.) and began pilot training at Randolph Field, Texas. In June 1933, he earned his pilot's wings and was commissioned a second lieutenant in the Army Reserve at Kelly Field, Texas. He was assigned to the 20th Bombardment Squadron at Langley Field, Virginia, flying the Keystone B-6 and Curtiss B-2 Condor bombers. In February and March 1934, he was part of the Army Air Corps unit delivering U.S. mail during the Air Mail scandal, flying the Chicago-to-Nashville route. The operation was unsuccessful, marred by several fatal accidents in which the Air Corps took the brunt of public blame. Upset by what he viewed as the injustice of the criticism, Lay began his writing career while still on active duty by submitting rebuttal articles and pieces on aviation in general, published in The Sportsman Pilot, Esquire, The Saturday Evening Post, Today, and Harper's. In November 1935, he left active duty, but remained a reserve officer, promoted to first lieutenant on August 16, 1936.

== Return to civilian life ==
Lay went to work for The Sportsman Pilot and became its managing editor. In 1936, he began writing an autobiographical book about his experiences in pilot training titled I Wanted Wings, published by Harper Brothers in 1937. He was approached by Hollywood producer Arthur Hornblow Jr. to sell the film rights to Paramount Pictures and to write the screenplay for a film adaptation. Lay agreed, and worked three years on the project, but the final product was largely the result of rewrites by a team of screenwriters brought into the project. The film received praise for its realistic flight training scenes. During this time, he met and married Philippa Ludwell Lee, and made the acquaintance of Captain Frank A. Armstrong at Barksdale Field, Louisiana, where Armstrong commanded the 13th Bomb Squadron.

== World War II service ==
Lay returned to active duty at his own request just after the outbreak of World War II in 1939, as a flying instructor in Chino, California. The publication of I Wanted Wings brought Lay to the attention of the staff of Army Air Forces colonel Ira C. Eaker, chief of the Air Corps Information Division and himself a writer. After meeting Lt. Lay, Eaker arranged his transfer to Headquarters USAAC in Washington, DC, in early 1940. There, promoted to captain, he worked primarily as a speechwriter for General Henry H. Arnold, Chief of the Army Air Corps.

In January 1942, Eaker was made brigadier general and was deployed to England to create what would become the Eighth Air Force. Lay was made part of Eaker's staff cadre, as Eighth Air Force historian and film unit commander. In the first half of 1943, he commanded Hollywood director William Wyler (then a major) while Wyler and his team were in England making the promotional movie Memphis Belle. Lay was promoted to lieutenant colonel, and in August 1943, he was granted permission to obtain combat experience in preparation for possible command of a combat unit. During that month, he flew five missions with the 100th Bomb Group, a B-17 Flying Fortress unit stationed at RAF Thorpe Abbotts, including the Regensburg portion of the costly Schweinfurt–Regensburg mission, which he flew as a co-pilot. Lay wrote a detailed critique of the mission for Brig. Gen. Curtis LeMay, and used much of the content in an article entitled "I Saw Regensburg Destroyed", which appeared in the November 6, 1943, issue of The Saturday Evening Post. The same material also became a chapter in Twelve O'Clock High. Lay returned to the United States, where he was assigned to a B-24 Liberator unit undergoing group training at Salt Lake City, Utah, the 490th Bombardment Group. On February 28, 1944, he was given command of the 487th Bombardment Group at Alamogordo, New Mexico, which he took overseas to Lavenham, England, in April.

On May 11, 1944, Lt. Col. Lay led his group to Troyes, France, on its fourth combat mission. His group encountered heavy flak near Châteaudun, the location of a Luftwaffe fighter airfield, and both Lay's B-24 and that of his deputy commander were shot down. Lay parachuted from his aircraft near Coulonges-les-Sablons and was hidden by members of the French Resistance. As news of the Allied approach following D-Day reached Lay, he decided to attempt to join up with the Allied advance units. Lay did this without being shot by his own side and returned successfully to England in August. Lay was prohibited from further combat because of his knowledge of underground activities. From this experience, he authored a second book, published by Harper Brothers in 1945, I've Had It: The Survival of a Bomb Group Commander, which was reissued in 1980 by Dodd, Mead and Company under a new title, Presumed Dead. Lay also wrote an episode for the television series Combat! entitled: "The Milk Run", which appeared to be loosely based on his own experiences.

== Second return to civilian life ==
Lay returned to Hollywood after the war. He was working there in 1946 when he was approached by Sy Bartlett, another Eighth Air Force veteran, to collaborate on the novel-screenplay project which became Twelve O'Clock High, with the book published in 1948 and the film released in 1949 earning Lay an Academy Award nomination. Lay continued as a colonel in the Air Force Reserve and with fellow reservist James Stewart approached Paramount with a concept for the film Strategic Air Command.

Lay continued as a screenwriter for movies and television during the 1960s, while in the employ of Networks Electronics Corporation in Chatsworth, California, as vice president. In the mid-1960s, he was joined by Gale Cleven, who joined the company as senior vice president, and a year later by General LeMay. Lay retired in Westwood, Los Angeles, California, where he died on May 26, 1982, of cancer. He left behind his wife, Philippa Ludwell Lay, and two daughters.

== Published works ==
=== Screenwriting credits ===
- I Wanted Wings (1941) Starring Ray Miiland (Jeff Young), William Holden (Al Ludlow), and Brian Donlevy (Capt. Mercer).
- Twelve O'Clock High (1949)
- Flying Leathernecks (1951, uncredited)
- Above and Beyond (1952)
- Strategic Air Command (1955)
- Toward the Unknown (1956; also associate producer)
- The Silent Service (1957 TV series; episodes "Tirante Plays a Hunch" and "Two Davids and Goliath")
- Men into Space (1959) (TV series)
- The Gallant Hours (1960)
- The Young and The Brave (1963; also actor)
- The Lieutenant (1963–1964) (TV series); two episodes
- Twelve O'Clock High (1964) (TV series, episode)

=== Books ===
- I Wanted Wings (1937)
- I've Had It - The Survival of a Bomb Group Commander (1945)
- Twelve O'Clock High (with Sy Bartlett)(1948)
- Someone Has to Make it Happen - The Inside Story of Tex Thornton, The Man Who Built Litton Industries (1969)
- Earthbound Astronauts - The Builders of Apollo-Saturn (1971)

=== Articles ===
- "Aerobatics, Thirty Minutes" (Harper's Magazine, February 1936)
- "Bomber Number 148" (Harper's Magazine, March 1936)
- "Flyers Are Inarticulate" (Harper's Magazine, March 1937)
- "What it Takes to Bomb Germany" (Harper's Magazine, November 1943)
- "The Jet That Crashed Before Take-off" (Harper's Magazine, September 1957)

== Sources ==
- Coffey, Thomas M., Decision Over Schweinfurt (1977). ISBN 0-679-50763-9
- Farmer, James H., "Hollywood's Bomber Baron", Flight Journal, December 1999, Air Age Publishing.
- Duffin, Alan T., and Matheis, Paul. The 12 O'Clock High Logbook (2005), (pp. 7–14). ISBN 1-59393-033-X
- Freeman, Roger A., The Mighty Eighth (1993 edition), (pp. 4, 68, 141, 260). ISBN 0-87938-638-X
- Freeman, Roger A., The Mighty Eighth War Diary (1990), (pp. 91–95). ISBN 0-87938-495-6
- Simons, Graham M and Friedman, Dr Harry, Memphis Belle - Dispelling the Myths (pp 254/5) GMS Enterprises . ISBN 1-904514-40-5
- Wilder, Elizabeth, family member
