= House of Numbers (1957 film) =

1957 film by Russell Rouse

- Theatrical release poster
- Directed by: Russell Rouse
- Screenplay by: Don Mankiewicz; Russell Rouse
- Based on: the novel House of Numbers by Jack Finney
- Produced by: Charles Schnee
- Starring: Jack Palance; Barbara Lang
- Cinematography: George J. Folsey
- Edited by: John McSweeney Jr.
- Music by: André Previn
- Production company: Metro-Goldwyn-Mayer
- Distributed by: Metro-Goldwyn-Mayer
- Release date: September 12, 1957 (United States)
- Running time: 90 minutes
- Country: United States
- Language: English
- Budget: $1,008,000
- Box office: $1.1 million

House of Numbers is a 1957 American film noir produced and released by MGM, starring Jack Palance and Barbara Lang.

Based on author Jack Finney's 1957 novel of the same name, the film has Palance playing two similar-looking brothers, Bill and Arnie Judlow. Bill is a good citizen, trying to help his ex-professional boxer brother, Arnie, convicted of murder, escape from San Quentin State Prison to return to Arnie's wife, Ruth, played by Lang.

The movie was filmed on location at the prison and set in the adjacent community of San Quentin.

== Plot ==
Ex-prizefighter Arnie Judlow (Jack Palance) is two years into a life sentence at California’s San Quentin prison for a murder committed in a jealous rage. He recently pushed a guard over a third floor railing, and knows he faces the gas chamber if the guard dies. With the help of his wife, Ruth (Barbara Lang), and his lookalike brother, Bill [Jack Palance), he devises a plan to escape. Arnie tells Ruth during her frequent visits that there is an "industrial area" in the prison and a large pile of shipping crates there that are left unguarded overnight. Bill has always taken care of Arnie, and Ruth, who only knew Arnie for two weeks before marrying him, blames herself for his fatal outburst. The combative pair pose as a married couple and rent a house near the prison to orchestrate the breakout.

Bill and Ruth immediately rehearse Arnie's plan, which is to have Bill sneak into the prison and pose as him while Arnie digs a bolthole to hide in until he is ready to escape. Bill and Ruth meet their next-door neighbor, an overly inquisitive prison guard, Henry Nova (Harold J. Stone), who knows Arnie. Bill uses a grappling hook to scale the unguarded wall and hides in the crates overnight. After a brief surreptitious parley in the morning, Arnie goes to work as normal at the prison's textile mill adjacent to the crates. They switch places at the end of his shift so that Arnie can dig his shelter that night.

He does, then hides back in the crates. Bill takes Arnie's place in his cell and at work, then, after another switch, climbs the wall that night and returns home. It becomes clear that Bill and Ruth are developing romantic feelings for each other. Arnie returns to his cell and work as normal the next day, then starts a fire to create a distraction at the end of his shift and sneaks into the hole. The guards discover Arnie is missing and begin a prison-wide search for him.

Setting up a misdirection, Bill leaves scattered prison cigarette butts and pieces of an inmate ID card on the ground near a suitable intersection for a carjacking. He uses a fake wooden gun he had whittled to further the illusion that Arnie has escaped. While it convinces the warden (Edward Platt), nosey Nova sniffs out the ruse and attempts to blackmail Bill and Ruth for $15,000 dollars. Bill seeks to buy him off with $5,000, knowing he only has $2,500 to his name. Nova bites at the offer.

Bill hurriedly returns to the prison, climbs in, and joins Arnie in the bolthole. He reveals that Nova is on to their scheme. They scale the wall, but Nova is waiting below, gun in hand. Arnie overwhelms Nova and savagely beats him. Bill convinces Nova to keep his mouth shut or they will reveal his complicity in both the escape and blackmail. The pair return to the house, where Arnie reunites with Ruth, only to be coldly rejected. Conceding the hopelessness of a life on the run together, Arnie skulks off to a safehouse and life alone on the lam.

Bill and Ruth are summoned to the prison by the warden. They have been turned in by an anonymous caller for helping Arnie escape, and both face prison time for their complicity. He convinces them that Arnie has devolved into a reflexive killer, and with nothing to lose more innocent people will die at his hands. The pair recognize he is right, as Arnie has flatly told them he will never be taken alive. They also deduce that he is the one who ratted them out, paranoid that they are having an affair. The warden reveals that the guard has recovered, but is unable to identify his attacker. He promises them effective amnesty and treatment for Arnie if they reveal his new hideout, further assuaging their anxiety over betrayal by explaining that they are actually saving Arnie from certain death either by gunshot or execution for murders he is bound to commit. They concede the truth in the warden's appeal, and while seeking to deny their mutual attraction surrender Arnie for his own good.

== Cast ==
- Jack Palance as Arnie Judlow / Bill Judlow
- Harold J. Stone as Henry Nova - Prison Guard
- Edward Platt as The Warden
- Barbara Lang as Mrs. Ruth Judlow
- Frank Watkins as Brother
- Joe Conley as Convict in line
- Timothy Carey as Frenchy

== Reception ==
According to MGM records the film earned $500,000 in the US and Canada and $600,000 elsewhere, resulting in a loss of $92,000.

== See also ==
- List of American films of 1957
