= Frank Sullivan (film editor) =

American film editor (1896–1972)

- Born: Franklin Starbuck Sullivan; February 7, 1896; St. Paul, Minnesota, U.S.
- Died: September 30, 1972 (aged 76); Woodland Hills, Los Angeles, California, U.S.
- Resting place: Forest Lawn Memorial Park, Hollywood Hills
- Occupation: Film editor
- Years active: 1923–1962
- Spouse: Doris Sullivan
- Children: 2
- Relatives: C. Gardner Sullivan (brother)

Franklin Starbuck Sullivan (February 7, 1896 – September 30, 1972) was an American film editor.

== Biography ==
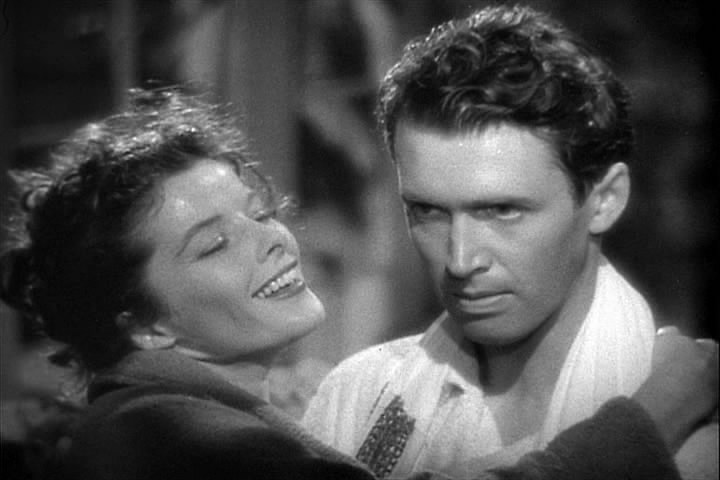
James Stewart and Katharine Hepburn in The Philadelphia Story trailer 1940

Born in St. Paul, Minnesota, Sullivan was the younger brother of C. Gardner Sullivan, a Hollywood screenwriter. He worked as an editor on such films as Fury (1936), Babes in Arms (1939), The Philadelphia Story (1940), and Woman of the Year (1942). He received an Academy Award for Best Film Editing nomination in 1949 for his work on Joan of Arc.

Sullivan was married to Doris Sullivan with whom he had two children. He died on September 30, 1972 Woodland Hills, Los Angeles at the age of 76. He is buried at Forest Lawn Memorial Park, Hollywood Hills.

== Partial filmography ==
- Torrent (1926)
- West Point (1927)
- Detectives (1928)
- The Unholy Three (1930)
- New Adventures of Get Rich Quick Wallingford (1931)
- Mata Hari (1931)
- The Gay Bride (1934)
- Fury (1936)
- The Last of Mrs. Cheyney (1937)
- Babes in Arms (1939)
- The Philadelphia Story (1940)
- Woman of the Year (1942)
- Thirty Seconds Over Tokyo (1944)
- Adventure (1945)
- Joan of Arc (1948)
- Teresa (1951)
- The Go-Getter (1956)
