= Twelve O'Clock High =

1949 film directed by Henry King

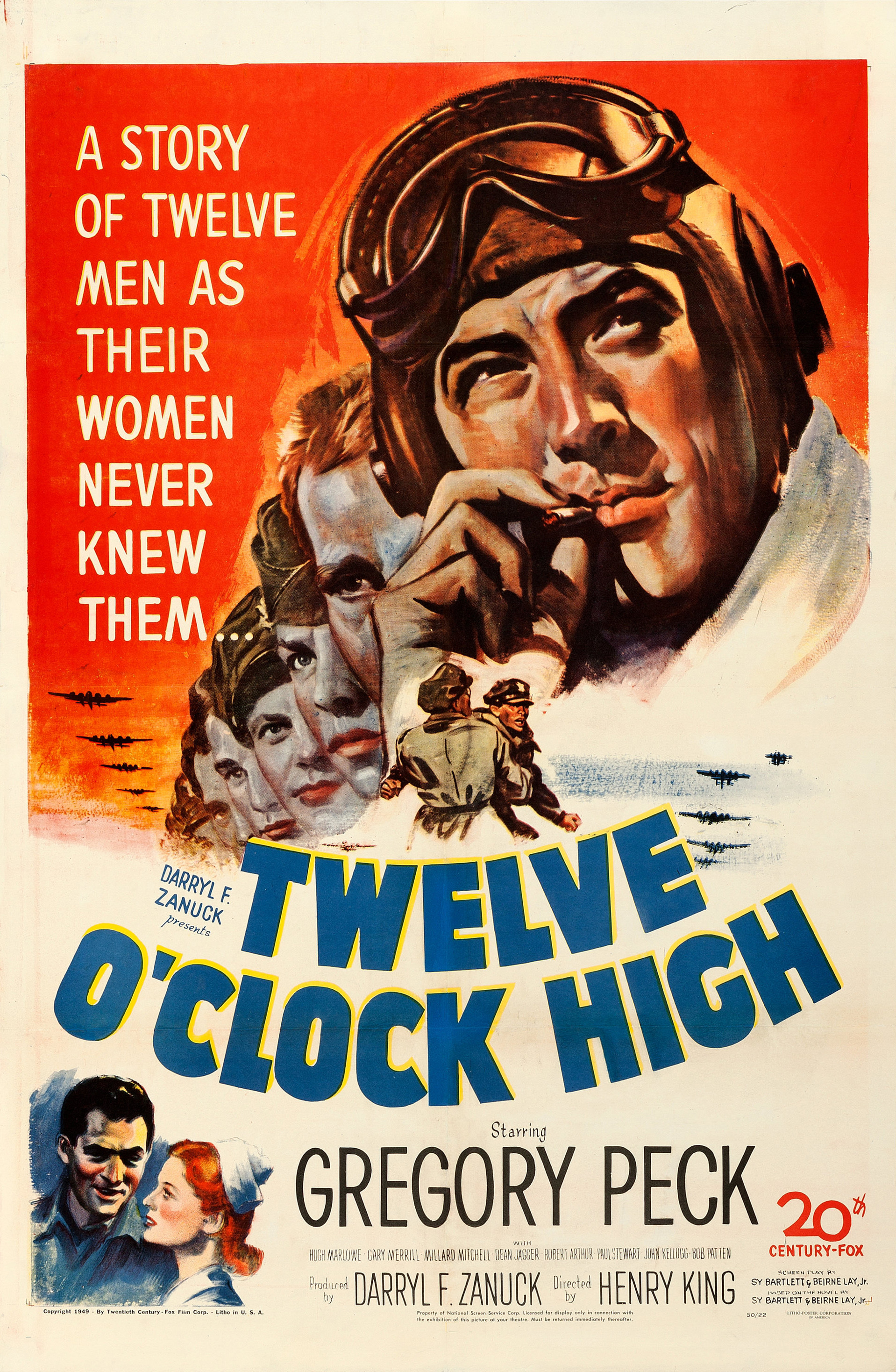
- Theatrical release poster
- Directed by: Henry King
- Screenplay by: Henry King (uncredited); Sy Bartlett; Beirne Lay Jr.
- Based on: Twelve O'Clock High by Sy Bartlett and Beirne Lay Jr.
- Produced by: Darryl F. Zanuck
- Starring: Gregory Peck
- Cinematography: Leon Shamroy
- Edited by: Barbara McLean
- Music by: Alfred Newman
- Distributed by: 20th Century-Fox
- Release dates: December 21, 1949 (Los Angeles); January 26, 1950 (New York City)
- Running time: 132 minutes
- Country: United States
- Language: English
- Box office: $3.2 million (U.S. rentals)

Twelve O'Clock High is a 1949 American war film directed by Henry King and based on the novel of the same name by Sy Bartlett and Beirne Lay Jr. It stars Gregory Peck as Brig. General Frank Savage. Hugh Marlowe, Gary Merrill, Millard Mitchell, and Dean Jagger also appear in supporting roles.

The film was nominated for four Academy Awards and won two: Dean Jagger for Best Actor in a Supporting Role, and Thomas T. Moulton for Best Sound Recording. In 1998, Twelve O'Clock High was selected for preservation in the United States National Film Registry by the Library of Congress as being "culturally, historically, or aesthetically significant".

== Plot ==
In 1949, former United States Army Air Forces officer Harvey Stovall spots a familiar Toby Jug in an English antique shop. He recognizes it from his wartime service at Archbury airfield, where it sat in the officers' club. He buys it and journeys to the derelict airfield, where he reflects on his service in World War II.

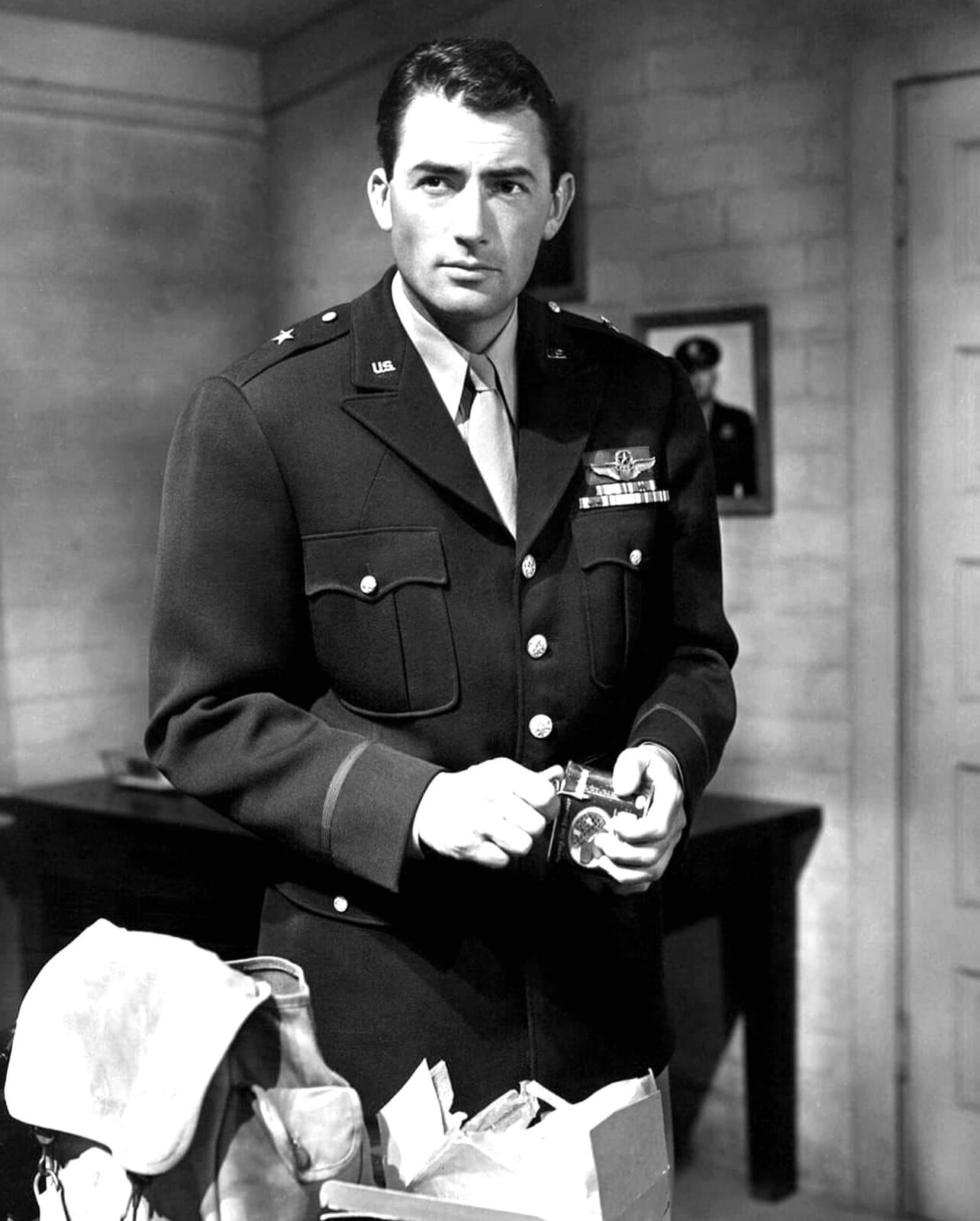
Gregory Peck as Brigadier General Frank Savage

In a flashback, the setting shifts to 1942, when the 918th Bomb Group at Archbury has gained a reputation as a "hard luck group". After a disastrous mission, group commander Colonel Keith Davenport appears exhausted and demoralized. His defeatist attitude spreads through the group's senior leadership, including his Air Exec, Lieutenant Colonel Ben Gately. Ordered to fly another mission the next day at a dangerously low altitude, Davenport protests to his friend, Brigadier General Frank Savage, the Assistant Chief of Staff for Operations at VIII Bomber Command. Savage reluctantly shares with Major General Pritchard, the commanding general of VIII Bomber Command, his belief that Davenport has become too emotionally close to his men and may no longer be fit to command. That night, Pritchard and Savage visit the group headquarters to investigate the cause of the mission's heavy losses. When Davenport refuses to discipline failed navigator Lieutenant Zimmerman, Pritchard realizes Savage is right, relieves Davenport of command, and places Savage in command.

Savage takes a harsh approach to restoring the group's discipline and morale. He reprimands Gately, demotes him to aircraft commander, and insists he fly every mission. Savage assigns Gately the least competent crewmen and orders him to paint the name "Leper Colony" on his airplane. Rough-and-ready Major Cobb impresses Savage with his independent spirit and replaces Gately as Air Exec. Savage conducts a series of training missions and waits for an opportunity to restore the group's pride in its abilities. Upset by the contrast of Savage's stern leadership with Davenport's easygoing ways, all of the group's pilots apply for transfer. Savage asks the Group Adjutant, Major Stovall, to delay processing their applications to buy him some time.

When several groups are ordered to abort a combat mission due to heavy weather, Savage ignores the recall order and the 918th is the only group to successfully bomb the target. Savage claims he didn't hear the recall due to a radio malfunction and persuades a furious Pritchard to recommend the group for a Distinguished Unit Citation. Savage also convinces Lieutenant Jesse Bishop, a Medal of Honor recipient, to be Savage's eyes and ears among the combat aircrews. When the Inspector General arrives to investigate the transfer requests, Savage packs his belongings, expecting to be relieved or court-martialed. But, led by Bishop, the pilots withdraw their requests. Savage softens his attitude towards the men as he becomes more closely involved with them. Gately goes on to win Savage's respect by demonstrating extraordinary leadership and courage in combat.

With enemy resistance intensifying as the air war advances deeper into Germany, missions become longer and riskier and many of Savage's best men are shot down or killed. Pritchard tries to get Savage to return to a staff job at VIII Bomber Command, but Savage feels that the 918th is not yet ready to do without him. Reluctantly, Pritchard leaves him in command. Ordered to return to the same target after a particularly brutal raid on a ball bearing factory, Savage finds himself physically unable to haul himself up into his B-17. Gately takes his place as lead pilot and strike commander for the mission. While waiting for the group's return, Savage becomes catatonic. Only as they return to Archbury does he regain his composure and fall asleep.

The story then returns to 1949, as Stovall pedals away from Archbury.

== Cast ==
- Gregory Peck as Brig. Gen. Frank Savage
- Hugh Marlowe as Lt. Col. Ben Gately
- Gary Merrill as Col. Keith Davenport
- Millard Mitchell as Maj. Gen. Pritchard
- Dean Jagger as Major Harvey Stovall
- Robert Arthur as Sgt. McIllhenny
- Paul Stewart as Major "Doc" Kaiser
- John Kellogg as Major Joe Cobb
- Robert Patten as Lt. Bishop (credited as Bob Patten)
- Lee MacGregor as Lt. Zimmerman
- Sam Edwards as Birdwell
- Roger Anderson as Interrogation Officer
- Kenneth Tobey as Guard Post Sergeant (uncredited)
- Barry Jones as Lord Haw-Haw (voice, uncredited)

== Historical counterparts of characters ==
The character Brigadier General Frank Savage was a composite of several group commanders, but the primary inspiration was Colonel Frank A. Armstrong, who commanded the 306th Bomb Group on which the 918th was modeled. The name "Savage" was inspired by Armstrong's Cherokee heritage. While his work with the 306th, which lasted only six weeks, consisted primarily of rebuilding the chain of command within the group, Armstrong had earlier performed a similar task with the 97th Bomb Group. Many of the training and disciplinary scenes in Twelve O'Clock High derive from that experience.

Towards the end of the film, the near-catatonic battle fatigue that General Savage suffered and the harrowing missions that led up to it were inspired by the experiences of Brigadier General Newton Longfellow. The symptoms of the breakdown were not based on any real-life event, but instead were intended to portray the effects of intense stress experienced by many airmen.

Major General Pritchard was modeled on the VIII Bomber Command's first commander, Major General Ira C. Eaker.

Colonel Keith Davenport was based on the first commander of the 306th Bomb Group, Colonel Charles B. Overacker, nicknamed "Chip". Of all the personalities portrayed in Twelve O'Clock High, that of Colonel Davenport most closely parallels his true-life counterpart. The early scene in which Davenport confronts Savage about a mission order was a close re-creation of an actual event, as was his relief.

Major (later Lieutenant Colonel) Harvey Stovall, who is a former World War I U.S. Army Air Service pilot who has returned to active duty as a nonflying adjutant, was modeled on William Howard Stovall, a World War I flying ace who returned to active duty as a major in the USAAF the week following Pearl Harbor, and served as the nonflying deputy chief of staff for personnel for the 8th Air Force in England for his World War I comrades, Brigadier General Frank O'Driscoll Hunter and General Carl Spaatz.

Second Lieutenant Jesse Bishop (played by Robert Patten), who belly-lands in the B-17 next to the runway at the beginning of the film and was nominated for the Medal of Honor, had his true-life counterpart in Second Lieutenant John C. Morgan. The description of Bishop's fight to control the bomber after his pilot was hit in the head by fragments of a 20 mm cannon shell is taken almost verbatim from Morgan's Medal of Honor citation. Details may be found in The 12 O'Clock High Logbook. Patten had been a USAAF navigator in World War II, the only member of the cast with aircrew experience.

Sergeant McIllhenny was drawn from a member of the 306th Bomb Group, Sgt Donald Bevan, a qualified gunner who was assigned ground jobs, including part-time driver for the commander of his squadron. Bevan had received publicity as a stowaway gunner (similar to McIllhenny in the film), though in reality, he had been invited to fly missions. Like McIllhenny, he proved to be a "born gunner".

The "tough guy" character Major Joe Cobb was inspired by Colonel Paul Tibbets, who had flown B-17s with Colonel Armstrong. (Note: Tibbetts was also the pilot of the B-29 Enola Gay, which dropped the atomic bomb on Hiroshima at the end of the war.) Tibbets was initially approved as the film's technical advisor in February 1949, but was replaced shortly after by Colonel John H. de Russy, a former operations officer for the 305th Bomb Group.

== Production ==
Paul Mantz deliberately crash-lands B-17G AAF Ser. No. 44-83592 at Ozark AAF, Alabama, in June 1949 for the filming of Twelve O'Clock High.

According to their files, 20th Century Fox paid $100,000 outright for the rights to the unfinished book, plus up to $100,000 more in escalator and book-club clauses. Darryl Zanuck was apparently convinced to pay this high price when he heard that William Wyler was interested in purchasing it for Paramount. Even then, Zanuck only went through with the deal in October 1947 when he was certain that the United States Air Force would support the production. The film made use of actual combat footage during the battle scenes, including some shot by the Luftwaffe. A good deal of the production was filmed on Eglin Air Force Base and its associated auxiliary fields near Fort Walton, Florida.

=== Source material ===
Screenwriters Bartlett and Lay drew on their own wartime experiences with Eighth Air Force bomber units. At the Eighth Air Force headquarters, Bartlett had worked closely with Colonel Armstrong, who was the primary model for the character General Savage. The film's 918th Bomber Group was modeled primarily on the 306th because that group remained a significant part of the Eighth Air Force throughout the war in Europe. (Note: Note that 918 is 3 times 306.)

=== Casting ===
Clark Gable was interested in the lead role of General Frank Savage. Gable, who had served in the USAAF during World War II, played a similar role in the 1948 film Command Decision. John Wayne was offered the leading role, as well, but turned it down. Burt Lancaster, James Cagney, Dana Andrews, Van Heflin, Edmond O'Brien, Ralph Bellamy, Robert Preston, Robert Young, and Robert Montgomery were also considered for the role. Eventually, the role went to Gregory Peck, who initially turned it down because the script was similar to Command Decision. Peck changed his mind because he was impressed with director Henry King, finding his empathy with the material and the cast and crew appealing. The two made more films together: The Gunfighter (1950), David and Bathsheba (1952), The Bravados (1958), and Beloved Infidel (1959).

=== Filming ===
Veterans of the heavy bomber campaign frequently cite Twelve O'Clock High as the only Hollywood film that accurately captured their combat experiences. Along with the 1948 film Command Decision, it marked a turning away from the optimistic, morale-boosting style of wartime films and toward a grittier realism that deals more directly with the human costs of war. Both films deal with the realities of daylight precision bombing without fighter escort, the basic USAAF doctrine at the start of World War II (prior to the arrival of long-range Allied fighter aircraft such as the P-51 Mustang). As producers, writers Lay and Bartlett reused major plot elements of Twelve O'Clock High in later films featuring the U.S. Air Force, the 1950s-era Toward the Unknown and the early 1960s Cold War-era A Gathering of Eagles.

Paul Mantz, Hollywood's leading stunt pilot, was paid the then-unprecedented sum of $4,500 in 1948 ($58,000 in 2024) to crash-land a B-17 bomber for one early scene in the film. Frank Tallman, Mantz' partner in Tallmantz Aviation, wrote in his autobiography that while many B-17s had been landed by one pilot, as far as he knew, this flight was the first time that a B-17 ever took off with only one pilot and no other crew; nobody was sure that it could be done. " (Note: This allegation is at odds with both 20th Century-Fox press releases made during production and with research done by Duffin and Matheis for The 12 O'Clock High Logbook. Martin Caidin describes a 1961 solo flight by Gregory Board of a B-17 in his chapter, "The Amazing Mr. Board", in Everything But the Flak. Art Lacey also flew a B-17 solo in 1947, although this was not well known due to its being written off officially as weather damage when he crashed it.) The footage was used again in the 1962 film The War Lover.

Locations for creating the bomber airfield at the fictional RAF Archbury were scouted by director Henry King, flying his own Beech Bonanza some 16,000 miles in February and March 1949. King visited Eglin AFB on March 8, 1949, and found an ideal location for principal photography several miles north of the main base at its Eglin AFB Auxiliary Field No. 3, better known as Duke Field, where the mock installation with 15 buildings (including a World War II control tower) were constructed to simulate RAF Archbury. The film's technical advisor, Colonel John de Russy, was stationed at Maxwell Air Force Base, Alabama, at the time, and suggested Ozark Army Air Field near Daleville, Alabama (now known as Cairns Army Airfield, adjacent to Fort Rucker). King chose Cairns as the location for filming B-17 takeoffs and landings, including the B-17 belly landing sequence, since the light-colored runways at Eglin did not match wartime runways in England, which had been black to make them less visible to enemy aircraft. When the crew arrived at Cairns, it was also considered as "ideal for shots of Harvey Stovall reminiscing about his World War II service", since the field was somewhat overgrown. The opening and closing scenes of the derelict RAF Archbury, referencing themes in the film, have a very similar approach to the opening scenes of the derelict fictional RAF Halfpenny Field in the earlier 1945 film The Way to the Stars.

Additional background photography was shot at RAF Barford St John, a satellite station of RAF Croughton in Oxfordshire, England. Officially, the airfield is still under Ministry of Defence ownership following its closure in the late 1990s as a communications station linked to the since-closed RAF Upper Heyford. Other locations around Eglin AFB and Fort Walton also served as secondary locations for filming. The crew used 12 B-17s for filming, which were pulled from QB-17 drones used at Eglin and other B-17s from depot locations in Alabama and New Mexico. Since some of the aircraft had been used in the 1946 Bikini atomic experiments and absorbed high levels of radioactivity, they could only be used for shooting for limited periods.

Twelve O'Clock High was in production from late April to early July 1949. Although originally planned to be shot in Technicolor, it was instead shot in black and white, allowing the inclusion of actual combat footage by Allied and Luftwaffe cameras.

== Reception ==
Twelve O'Clock High premiered in Los Angeles on December 21, 1949, and opened in New York City on January 26, 1950. It went into general release in February 1950. An influential review by Bosley Crowther of The New York Times was indicative of many contemporary reviews. He noted that the film focused more on the human element than the aircraft or machinery of war. The Times picked Twelve O'Clock High as one of the 10 Best Films of 1949 and, in later years, it rated the film as one of the "Best 1000" of all time.

After attending the premiere, the commander of the Strategic Air Command and former group commander in the Eighth Air Force, General Curtis LeMay, told the authors that he "couldn't find anything wrong with it." It was required viewing at all the U.S. service academies, college/university Air Force Reserve Officer Training Corps detachments, Air Force Officer Training Schools, the U.S. Navy's former Aviation Officer Candidate School, and the Coast Guard Officer Candidate School, where it was used as a teaching example for the situational leadership theory, although not currently used by the USAF. The film is also widely used in both the military and civilian worlds to teach the principles of leadership.

Michael Gebert declares it the best film of 1949. and Christopher Tookey writes, it is "probably the best picture about the pressures which war imposes on those at the top."

In its initial release, the film took in $3,225,000 in rentals in the U.S. alone.

On the review aggregator website Rotten Tomatoes, 96% of 26 critics' reviews are positive. The website's consensus reads: "Twelve O'Clock High is a high-stakes, high-tension war drama powered by great, well-written characters."

== Awards and honors ==
Twelve O'Clock High won Academy Awards for Best Actor in a Supporting Role for Dean Jagger and Best Sound Recording. It was nominated for Best Actor in a Leading Role for Gregory Peck and Best Picture. In addition, Peck received the New York Film Critics Circle Award for Best Actor, and the film was nominated for Best Picture by the National Board of Review.

In 1998, the film was selected for preservation in the United States National Film Registry by the Library of Congress as being "culturally, historically, or aesthetically significant".

== Meaning of the title ==
The term "twelve o'clock high" refers to the practice of calling out the positions of attacking enemy aircraft by reference to an imaginary clock face, with the bomber at the center. The terms "high" (above the bomber), "level" (at the same altitude as the bomber) and "low" (below the bomber) further refine the location of the enemy. Thus "twelve o'clock high" meant the attacker was approaching from directly ahead and above. This location was preferred by German fighter pilots because, until the introduction of the Bendix chin turret in the B-17G model, the nose of the B-17 was the most lightly armed and vulnerable part of the bomber. Enemy fighter aircraft diving from above were also more difficult targets for the B-17 gunners due to their high closing speeds.

Bartlett's wife, actress Ellen Drew, named the story after hearing Bartlett and Lay discuss German fighter tactics, which usually involved head-on attacks from "twelve o'clock high".

== Radio and television ==
Gregory Peck repeated his role as General Savage on a Screen Guild Players radio broadcast on September 7, 1950.

Twelve O'Clock High later became a television series of the same name that premiered on the ABC network in 1964 and ran for three seasons. Robert Lansing played General Savage. At the end of the first season, Lansing was replaced by Paul Burke, who played Colonel Joseph Anson "Joe" Gallagher, a character loosely based on Ben Gately from the novel. Much of the combat footage seen in the film was reused in the television series.

Many of the television show's ground scenes were filmed at the Chino, California, airport, which had been used for training Army pilots during the war, and where a replica of a control tower, typical of the type seen at an 8th Air Force airfield in England, was built. The airfield itself was used in the immediate postwar period as a dump for soon-to-be-scrapped fighters and bombers, and was used for the penultimate scene in The Best Years of Our Lives when Dana Andrews relives his wartime experiences and goes on to rebuild his life.
