= The Hank McCune Show =

American television sitcom

- Genre: Sitcom
- Directed by: Charles Maxwell
- Starring: Hank McCune
- Country of origin: United States
- Original language: English

Production
- Producers: Samuel Z. Arkoff; Dick Farrell; Hank McCune
- Camera setup: Single-camera
- Running time: 25 minutes
- Production company: United Television Productions

Original release
- Network: NBC
- Release: September 9 – December 2, 1950

The Hank McCune Show is an American television sitcom. Filmed without a studio audience, the series is notable for being the first television program to incorporate a laugh track.

The series began as a local program in New York in 1949. NBC placed it on its national primetime schedule at the start of the 1950–51 season. It debuted at 7:00pm Eastern Time on September 9 and was cancelled three months later. It was briefly resurrected as a syndicated program in 1953–54, but without a laugh track.

== Overview ==
The premise foreshadowed that of The Larry Sanders Show in that it contained a show within a show. Former radio comedian McCune portrayed a television variety show host named after himself, and each week the character managed to blunder his way into a variety of comic predicaments.

The supporting cast included Larry Keating, Charles Maxwell, Frank Nelson, Arthur Q. Bryan, Sara Berner, Tammy Kiper, and Florence Bates.

== Production ==
United Television Productions produced the show, and Harold Schuster was the producer. Mort Lachman and Cy Rose were the writers.

Although ratings "weren't terrible", the sponsor left after the then-minimum 13 weeks of shows.

== Syndicated version ==
Bing Crosby Enterprises produced the syndicated version of The Hank McCune Show. It was distributed by CBS's TV film sales division.

== See also ==
- 1950-51 United States network television schedule
