= NATO Double-Track Decision =

Armament resolution by NATO

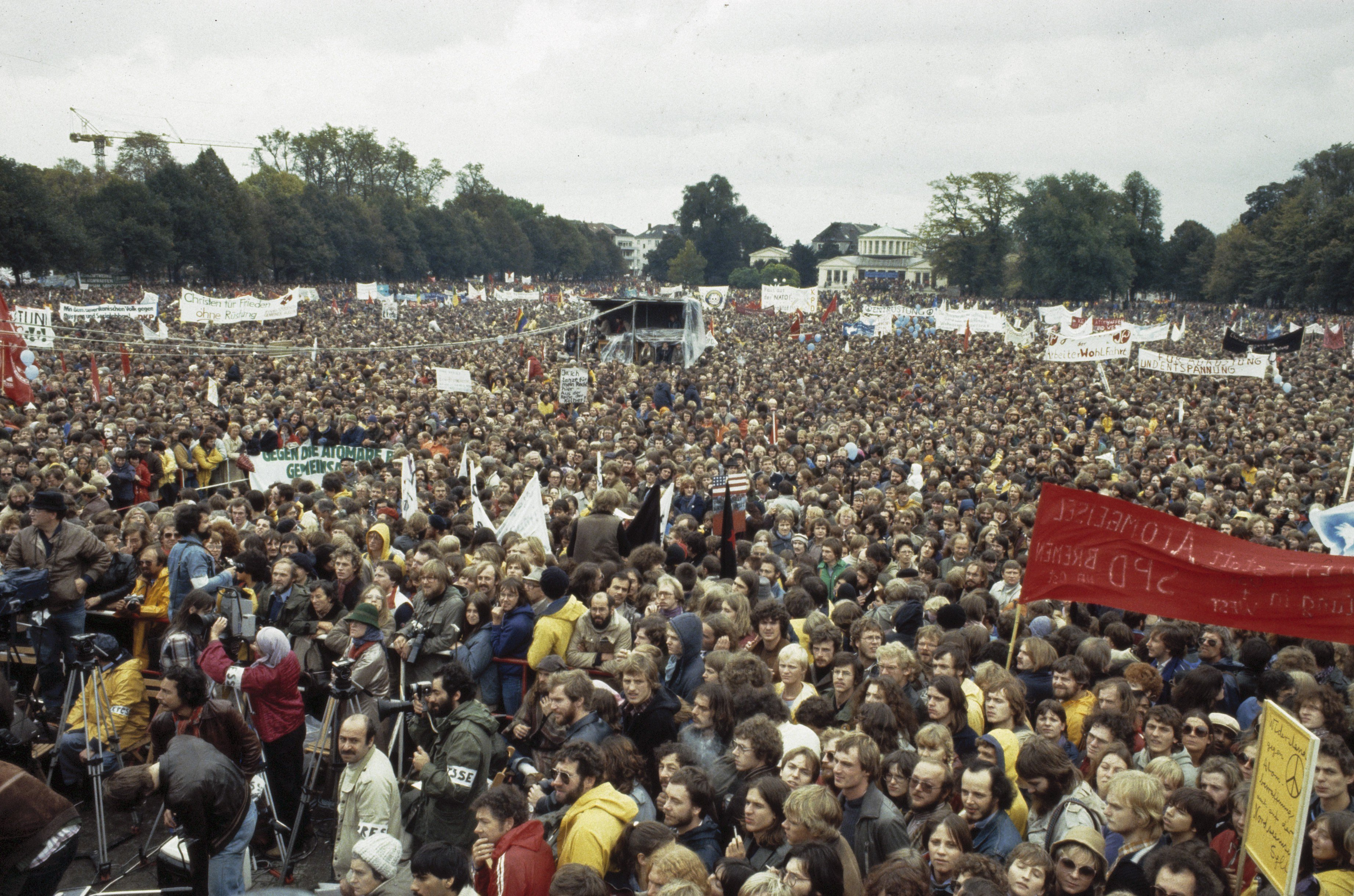
Protest in Bonn against the nuclear arms race between NATO and the Warsaw Pact, 1981

The NATO Double-Track Decision was a decision by NATO made on December 12, 1979, to resolve the Euromissile Crisis involving the deployment of advanced Soviet and American missiles in Europe through the late 1970s to the early 1980s. The decision involved two "tracks", depending on the Soviet response. The first track would involve successful negotiations resulting in a treaty and failing that, the second track would involve the deployment of Pershing II and ground launched cruise missiles. Protests sprung out against the deployment of American weapons across the Western Bloc in Europe.

== Background ==
The détente between the United States and the Soviet Union culminated in the signing of SALT I and the Anti-Ballistic Missile Treaty (1972), as well as negotiations toward SALT II (1979). Through these agreements, the two countries agreed to freeze the number of strategic ballistic missile launchers at existing levels, reduce the number of anti-ballistic missiles and not build more ground-based launchers.

Along with the 1973 Agreement on the Prevention of Nuclear War, these arms control measures caused European NATO members, especially West Germany, to feel overlooked. On 28 October 1977, Chancellor Helmut Schmidt gave a speech at the International Institute for Strategic Studies in London in which he condemned the threat posed to Western Europe by the SS-20 missiles being deployed by the Soviet Union in Eastern Europe earlier that year and publicly expressed a European concern that the strategic nuclear parity reduced the credibility of the American nuclear guarantee and exacerbated the military imbalance within Europe. The road-mobile SS-20 missile was capable of carrying up to three MIRV warheads and was more accurate than the previously deployed SS-4 and SS-5 missiles.

The strategic nuclear parity between the United States and Soviet Union achieved through the SALT I, ABM and SALT II arms control agreements, and the development of new intermediate-range nuclear missiles by the Soviet Union, led to fears of "decoupling" among non-nuclear European NATO members. According to Noel D. Cary, "unless America was unswervingly prepared to risk the sacrifice of one of its cities to save a German one, West Germany might be vulnerable to Soviet political blackmail."

== NATO Double-Track Decision ==
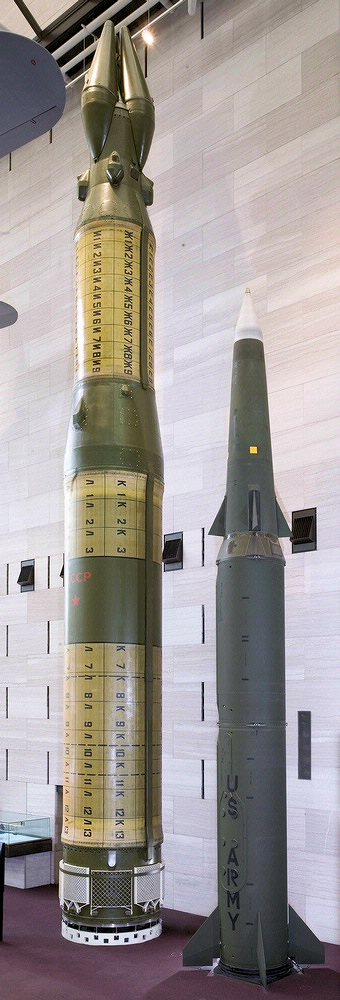
SS-20 and Pershing II missiles, National Air and Space Museum

The decision was prompted by the continuing military buildup of Warsaw Pact countries, particularly their growing capability in nuclear systems threatening Western Europe. European NATO members were especially concerned about the growth of long-range theatre nuclear forces (LRTNF) such as the SS-20 and Tupolev Tu-22M 'Backfire' bomber.

On 12 December 1979, at a special meeting of NATO Foreign and Defence Ministers in Brussels, the so-called NATO Double-Track Decision was adopted. The ministers resolved to modernise NATO's LRTNF by deploying 108 Pershing II launchers to replace the existing American Pershing 1a missiles and an additional 464 BGM-109G Ground Launched Cruise Missiles (GLCMs) ("track two") if negotiations for reciprocal limits ("track one") failed by the fall of 1983. NATO offered immediate negotiations with the goal of banning nuclear armed middle-range missiles from Europe completely, with the provision that the missiles could be installed four years later if the negotiations failed.

The Soviet Union was critical of the fact that neither French nor British nuclear weapons had been considered in the arms control negotiations.

=== Protests ===
Soon after the NATO Double Track Decision opposition started to mount. In November 1980, German Green Party politician Gert Bastian and peace activist Josef Weber [de] drafted the Krefeld appeal [de] calling for the federal government of West Germany to retract its support for the deployment of Pershing II missiles in the country and GLCMs across Europe. The Krefeld appeal also called upon West Germany to oppose a nuclear arms race, emphasizing that the nuclear armament of the two Cold War superpowers is endangering Europeans in particular. By 1983 the Krefeld appeal had gained five million signatures and opposition to the NATO Double Track Decision became a minimal consensus for the peace movement.

== "Track One" negotiations ==
The Soviet Union and United States agreed to open negotiations and preliminary discussions, named the Preliminary Intermediate-Range Nuclear Forces Talks, which began in Geneva, Switzerland, in October 1980. The relations were strained at the time due to the December 1979 Soviet invasion of Afghanistan which led America to impose sanctions against the USSR. Formal talks began on 30 November 1981, with the U.S. negotiators led by President Ronald Reagan and those of the Soviet Union by General Secretary, Leonid Brezhnev. The core of the U.S. negotiating position reflected the principles put forth during the Presidency of Jimmy Carter: any limits placed on U.S. intermediate-range capabilities, both in terms of "ceilings" and "rights", must be reciprocated with limits on Soviet systems. Additionally, the United States insisted that a sufficient verification regime be put in place due to their low trust in the Russians.

Between 1981 and 1983, American and Soviet negotiators gathered for six rounds of talks, each two months in length—a system based on the earlier SALT talks. The US delegation was composed of Paul Nitze, Major General William F. Burns of the Joint Chiefs of Staff, Thomas Graham of the Arms Control and Disarmament Agency (ACDA), and officials from the US Department of State, Office of the Secretary of Defense, and US National Security Council. In the fall of 1983, just ahead of the scheduled deployment of US Pershing IIs and GLCMs, the United States lowered its proposed limit on global INF deployments to 420 missiles, while the Soviet Union proposed "equal reductions": if the US cancelled the planned deployment of Pershing II and GLCM systems, the Soviet Union would reduce its own INF deployment by 572 warheads. In November 1983, after the first Pershing IIs arrived in West Germany, the Soviet Union ended negotiations.

=== Intermediate-Range Nuclear Forces Treaty ===
On 8 December 1987 the United States and the Soviet Union signed the Intermediate-Range Nuclear Forces Treaty. This treaty reverted the double-track policy. This treaty also provided for the destruction of all middle-range weapons and ended this episode of the Cold War.

== "Track Two" deployments ==
=== Pershing II ===
The Pershing II launchers began to be deployed in West Germany in late November 1983 and the deployment of 108 launchers was completed in late 1985. Initial Operational Status (IOS) was achieved on 15 December 1983 when A Battery, 1st Battalion, 41st Field Artillery Regiment rotated onto operational status at the Missile Storage Area (MSA) in Mutlangen. The West German government announced on 13 December 1985 that the US Army 56th Field Artillery Brigade was equipped with 108 Pershing II launchers across three missile battalions stationed at Neu-Ulm, Mutlangen and Neckarsulm.

=== BGM-109G Ground Launched Cruise Missile ===
464 BGM-109G missiles would be based at six locations throughout Europe: 160 at RAF Greenham Common and RAF Molesworth in the United Kingdom, 112 at Comiso Air Station in Italy, 96 at Wueschheim Air Station in West Germany, 48 at the Woensdrecht Air Base in the Netherlands, and 48 at the Florennes Air Base in Belgium.
