= RSD-10 Pioneer =

Soviet intermediate-range ballistic missile (1976–1988)

RSD-10 Pioneer SS-20 Saber
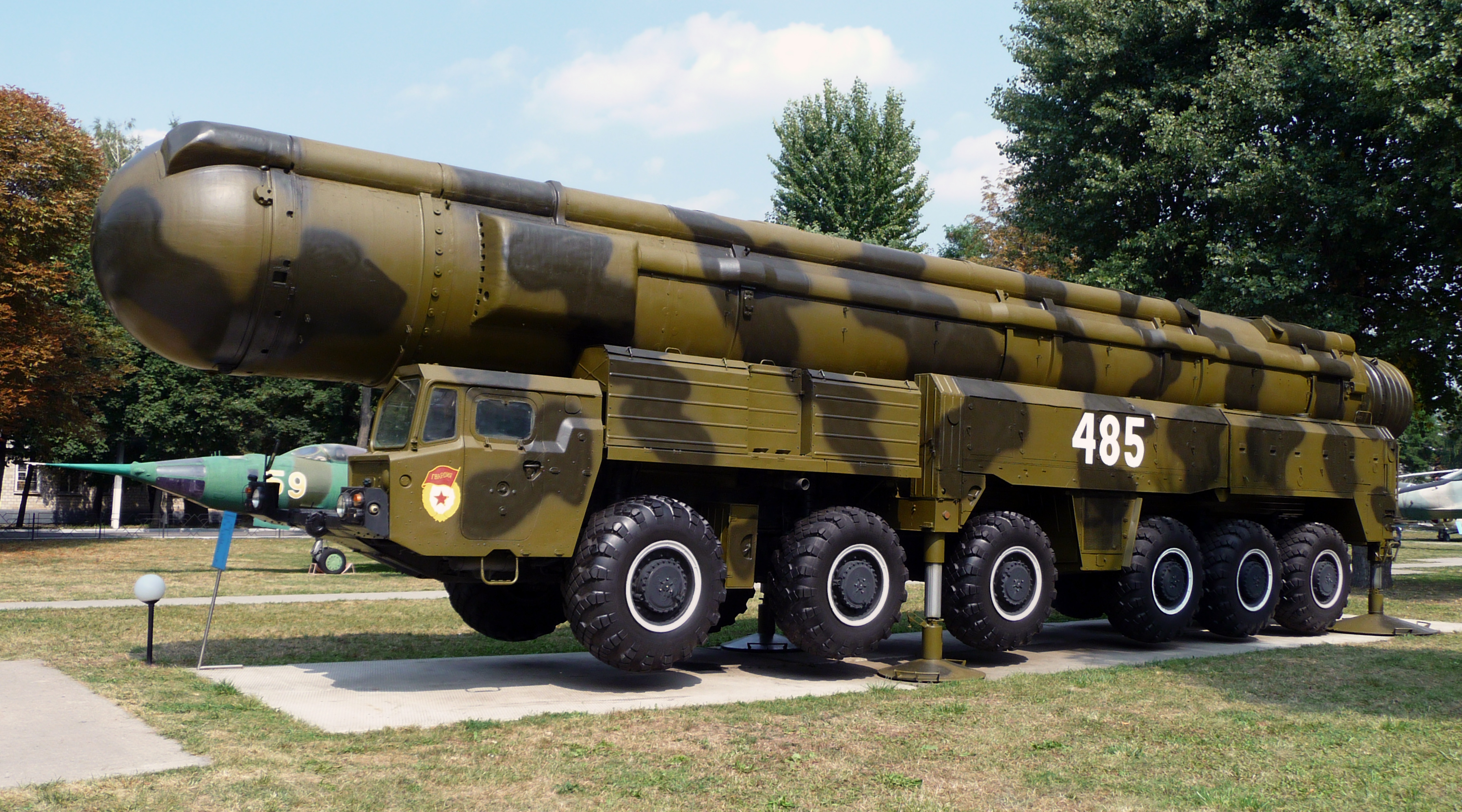
- RSD-10 Pioneer missile and launcher on display in Vinnytsia
- Type: Intermediate-range ballistic missile
- Place of origin: Soviet Union

Service history
- In service: 1976 – 1988
- Used by: Soviet Strategic Rocket Forces

Production history
- Designer: Alexander Nadiradze (Moscow Institute of Thermal Technology)
- Manufacturer: Votkinsk Machine Building Plant

Specifications
- Mass: 37,100 kg (81,800 lb)
- Length: 16.5 m (54 ft)
- Diameter: 1.8 m (5 ft 11 in)
- Warhead: 1 x 1 Mt or 3 x 150 kt
- Engine: Two-stage solid-fuel rocket
- Operational range: 5,800 km (3,600 mi)
- Maximum speed: Up to 7.43 km/s
- Guidance system: Inertial
- Accuracy: 150-450 m CEP
- Launch platform: Road-mobile TEL

The RSD-10 Pioneer (Russian: ракета средней дальности (РСД) «Пионер» tr.: raketa sredney dalnosti (RSD) "Pioner"; English: Medium-Range Missile "Pioneer") was an intermediate-range ballistic missile with a nuclear warhead, deployed by the Soviet Union from 1976 to 1988. It carried GRAU designation 15Ж45 (15Zh45). Its NATO reporting name was SS-20 Saber.

Its deployment was a major cause of NATO's 'Double-Track Decision', which led to the deployment of more medium-range nuclear weapons in Western Europe. The RSD-10 was withdrawn from service under the 1987 Intermediate-Range Nuclear Forces Treaty.

== Specifications ==
The missile was 16.5 metres (54 ft) high, 1.8 metres (5.9 ft) in diameter and weighed 37.1 tons. It was based on two solid-fuel fiberglass clad stages of the RT-21 Temp 2S (SS-16 Sinner), so it was also known as the RT-21M Pioneer. The missile's range was from 600 to 5,700 kilometres (370 to 3,540 mi) initially; the final model had a maximum range of possibly 7,500 kilometres (4,700 mi). Initially the missile was fitted with a single 1 megaton, 1.6 ton warhead. Later models could take one or two (and from 1980, three) additional 150 kiloton MIRV devices (Pioneer UTTH). The CEP was also reduced from 550 metres (1,800 ft) to 150 to 450 metres (490 to 1,480 ft). The missile was the first Soviet missile equipped with solid fuel instead of liquid fuel, which meant that it could be launched once the order had been given instead of requiring hours doing the dangerous work of pumping the missile with liquid fuel.

The missile used a MAZ-547A/MAZ-7916 transporter erector launcher (TEL) produced in the Belarusian SSR by the Minsk Automobile Plant. The TEL was originally designed for the RT-21 Temp 2S intercontinental ballistic missile.

On 10 August 1979 testing of the modernized "Pioneer"-UTTKh (15Zh53) began at the Kapustin Yar test site. It continued through 14 August 1980, and on 17 December 1980 the missile was deployed. Designated by NATO as SS-20 Mod3, this variant had the same propulsion system as earlier versions, but due to upgrading of a command structure and instrumentation-service unit it was possible to improve accuracy (CEP) from 550 to 450 meters, to increase maximum range by 10%, and to increase the area covered by the warheads. This latest RSD-10 variant subsequently received NATO reporting name SS-28 Saber 2.

== Development ==
It was intended to replace, or augment, the R-12 Dvina (SS-4 Sandal) and R-14 Chusovaya (SS-5 Skean) missiles deployed from 1958 and 1961 respectively in the USSR and Warsaw Pact states. It entered the development stage in 1966 and a design concept was approved in 1968 with the task given to the Moscow Institute of Thermal Technology and Alexander Nadiradze, who also developed the RT-21 Temp 2S in the same period. Flight testing began in 1974 and deployment commenced on 11 March 1976, with the first supplied units becoming operational that August. Up to 1986, a total of 48 launch sites including a site at Pavschino, were equipped with 435 RSD-10 missiles under control of the Strategic Missile Forces.

There were several theories as to why the Soviet Union developed the RSD-10:

- Some in the United States such as Richard Perle saw it as a part of a bid for global power on the part of the Soviet Union.
- Another popular theory held that the SALT treaties, by placing quantitative limits on long-range missiles, had encouraged the Soviets to place more emphasis on medium-range missiles, which were not covered by SALT.
- Another theory held that the RSD-10 was the "son" of the failed RT-21 Temp 2S ICBM project. Following the failure of the RT-21, the Soviets simply used the technology and parts that had been developed for the RT-21 for the RSD-10.
- Others argued that it was part of an attempt on the part of the Soviet military to develop a more sophisticated nuclear strategy that did not call for an all out nuclear first strike as soon as World War III began by giving the Soviets a second strike capability that they had previously lacked.

During the 1960s, Soviet missile procurement was dominated by the ideas of Defence Minister, Marshal Andrei Grechko who was opposed to the idea of nuclear weapons as a weapon of last resort, and planned, if World War III commenced, to begin that conflict with an immediate nuclear strike on the NATO nations. By the early 1970s, Grechko's views had caused opposition within the military and the political leadership, who wanted the Soviet Union to have a second strike capacity in order to prevent a war with the United States from going nuclear immediately as Grechko preferred. More importantly, the increasing influence of Marshal Dmitriy Ustinov heralded a shift in Soviet thinking about nuclear weapons. Ustinov was a man closely connected with the various Soviet design bureaus, and who generally sided with demands of the design bureaus against the military regarding weapons procurement. The decision to order and introduce the Pioneer in the mid-1970s was in large part due to Ustinov's wishes to shift military procurement out of the hands of the military and into the design bureaus, who in turn pressed for more and varied weapons as a way of increasing orders. The British historian James Cant wrote that it was the triumph of the Soviet version of the military-industrial complex over the military as regarding weapons procurement that was the most important reason for the Pioneer.

== Deployment ==
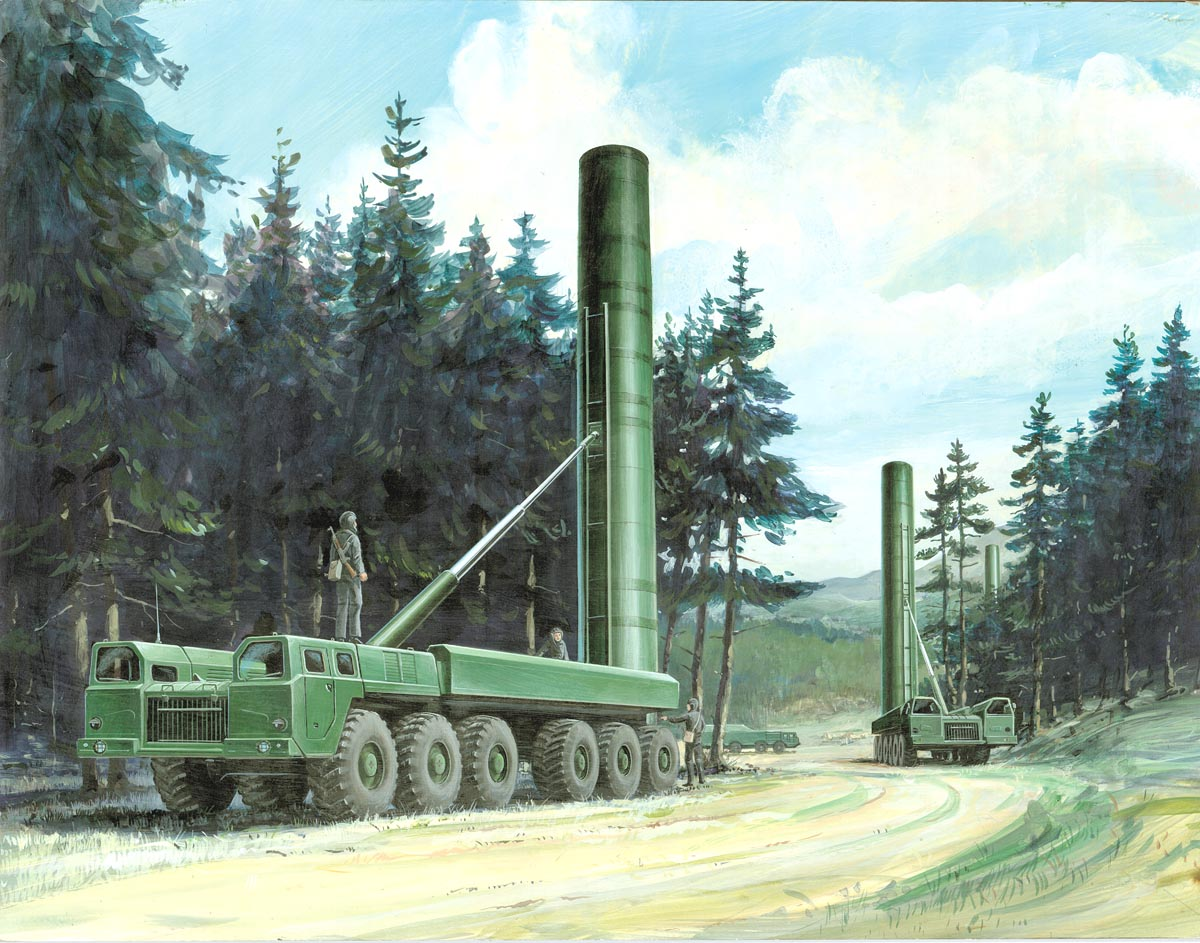
RSD-10 missile and its transporter erector launcher (artist impression)

While the Warsaw Pact arguably enjoyed a massive conventional superiority over NATO in Central Europe, Soviet leaders assumed that NATO would use tactical nuclear weapons to stop a massive Warsaw Pact counteroffensive. The RSD-10 provided the Soviet Union with an in-theater "selective" targeting capability that it previously had lacked. The RSD-10 had the capacity to destroy all NATO bases and installations with negligible warning. Thus, the Soviet Union acquired the capability to neutralise NATO's tactical nuclear forces with surgical nuclear strikes.

In 1979, when the Soviet Union had 14 (1 operational) RSD-10 launch sites, NATO decided to deploy US Pershing II missiles and BGM-109G Ground Launched Cruise Missiles in Western Europe in an attempt to counter the RSD-10, known as the NATO Double-Track Decision.

== Decommissioning ==
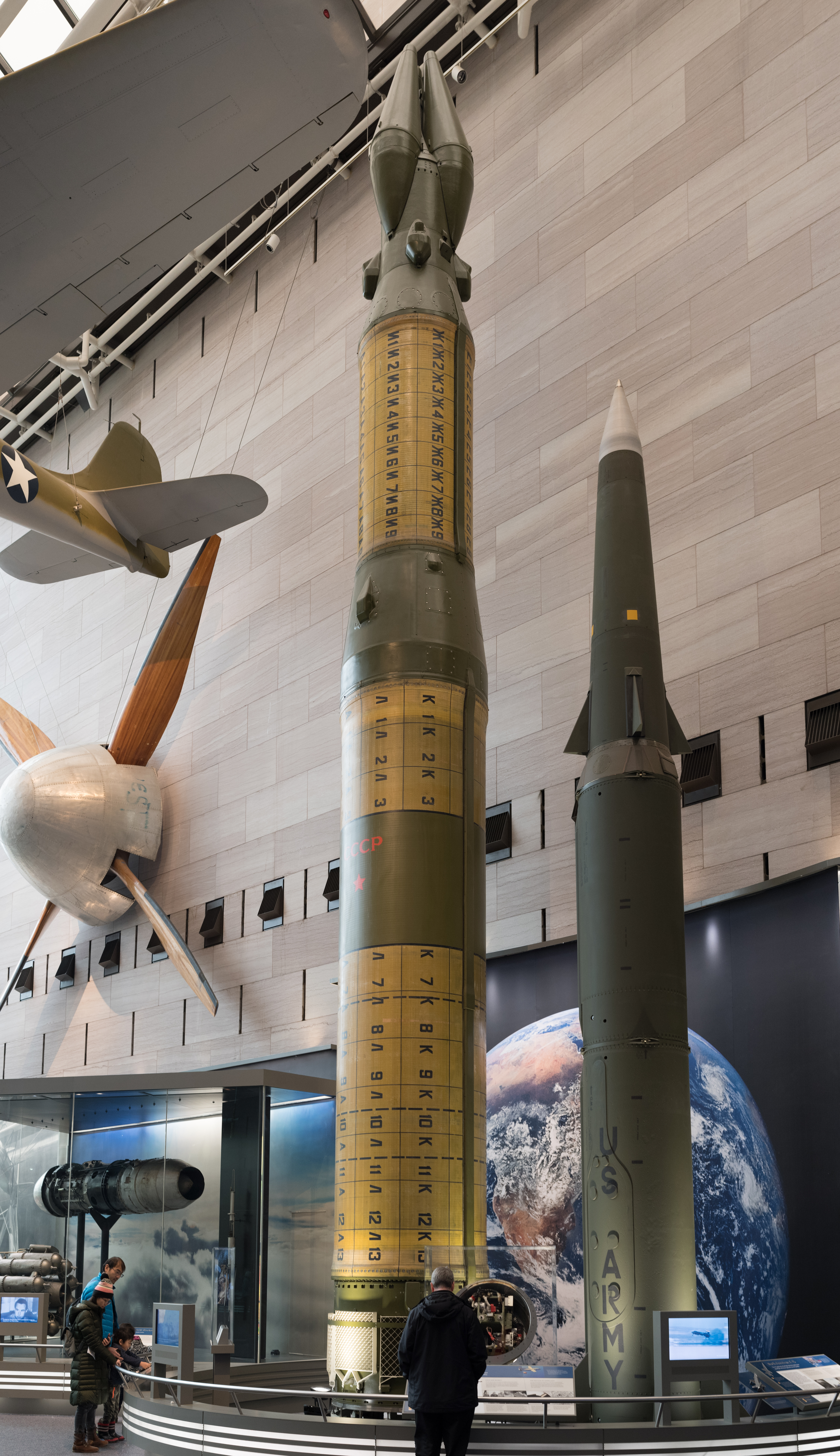
RSD-10 Pioneer missile with re-entry bodies next to a Pershing II at the US National Air and Space Museum

654 missiles were built in total. These and the 499 associated mobile launchers were destroyed by May 1991 in accordance with the Intermediate-Range Nuclear Forces Treaty. Fifteen RSD-10, eight BGM-109G Gryphon and seven Pershing II missiles were preserved to commemorate this agreement. One RSD-10 can be seen in the grounds of the National Museum of the History of Ukraine in the Second World War, one at the Ukraine Air Force Museum in Vinnytsia, Ukraine, and another is inside the Smithsonian National Air and Space Museum at Washington, D.C., US.

North Korea has acquired an unknown number of demilitarized RSD-10 transporter erector launchers from Russia or from Belarus for use with the BM25 Musudan missile.

== Operators ==
=== Former operators ===
Soviet Union

- 23rd Guards Rocket Division, Kansk, Krasnoyarsk Krai, c.1983–1988
- Other rocket divisions
