= Thomas Graham Jr. (diplomat) =

American diplomat (1933–2026)

Arms Control and Disarmament Agency
- In office 1970–1997

Bill Clinton's Special Representative for Arms Control, Non-Proliferation, and Disarmament
- In office 1994–1997

Acting Director and Acting Deputy Director of the U.S Arms Control and Disarmament Agency
- In office January 1993 – July 1994

Personal details
- Born: October 9, 1933 Louisville, Kentucky, U.S.
- Died: September 3, 2026 (aged 92) Washington, D.C., U.S.
- Party: Democratic 2012–present
- Other political affiliations: Democratic 1951–1968 Republican 1968–2010; Independent 2010–2012
- Spouse: Christine Coffey Ryan
- Children: Elizabeth Graham Brookfield; Thomas L. Graham; Clover Graham Hackett; Thomas C. Ryan (stepson); Missy C. Ryan (stepdaughter)
- Education: Princeton University; Harvard Law School
- Profession: Lawyer; Politician; Author; Businessman

Military service
- Branch/service: United States Army
- Years of service: 1956–1958

Thomas Graham Jr. (October 9, 1933 – September 3, 2026) was an American diplomat. Graham was involved in the negotiation of every single international arms control and non-proliferation agreement from 1970 to 1997. This includes the Strategic Arms Limitation Talks (SALT Treaties), the Strategic Arms Reduction Treaties (START Treaties), the Anti-ballistic missile (ABM) Treaty, Intermediate-Range Nuclear Forces Treaty (INF) Treaty, Treaty on the Non-Proliferation of Nuclear Weapons Treaty (NPT), Treaty on Conventional Armed Forces in Europe (CFE) Treaty and Comprehensive Nuclear-Test-Ban Treaty (CTBT). In 1993, Ambassador Graham served as acting director of the Arms Control and Disarmament Agency (ACDA) from January to November, 1993 and acting deputy director from November, 1993 to July, 1994. From 1994 through 1997, he was president Bill Clinton's special representative for Arms Control, Non-Proliferation, and Disarmament. Graham successfully led the U.S. government efforts to achieve the permanent extension of the NPT in 1995. Graham also served for 15 years as the general counsel of ACDA. Throughout his career, Thomas Graham has worked with six U.S. Presidents including Presidents Richard Nixon, Gerald Ford, Jimmy Carter, Ronald Reagan, George H. W. Bush, and Bill Clinton. Ambassador Graham worked on the negotiation of the Chemical Weapons Convention and the Biological Weapons Convention and managed the Senate approval of the ratification of the Geneva Protocol banning the use of chemical and biological weapons in war, as well as the Biological Weapons Convention.

Graham was also the director and board chairman of CanAlaska Uranium, a mining exploration company. He was a member of the New York, District of Columbia and Kentucky Bar Associations and a member of the Council on Foreign Relations. From 1986 to 1994 he chaired the committee on Arms Control and Disarmament of the American Bar Association. Graham was also the executive chairman of the Lightbridge Corporation and a National Advisory Board member of the Center for Arms Control and Non-Proliferation, the research arm of Council for a Livable World.

== Early life ==
Thomas Graham Jr. grew up in Louisville, Kentucky. He attended the Louisville Male High School. His grandfather, Thomas Jackson Graham, was a Presbyterian minister who moved to Louisville in 1920 to take over the Warren Memorial Presbyterian Church, the largest Presbyterian church in the city at that time. Several of Graham's family members were involved in politics. His great-uncle, William D. Connor, was lieutenant governor of Wisconsin under governor James O. Davidson (1907–1909) and chairman of the Republican Party in Wisconsin for many years. His grandmother's sister was the grandmother of Melvin Laird, President Nixon's secretary of defense. Graham's father, Thomas Graham, was the chairman of the sinking fund in Louisville. He was an active Democrat, served for many years as treasurer of the Democratic Party in Louisville, and remained politically active throughout his life.

== Education ==
While in Louisville Male High School, Graham was elected president of the Athenaeum Literary Association (an old and prestigious Louisville high school fraternity). He later attended Princeton University where he graduated with a B.A. from Woodrow Wilson School of Public and International Affairs in 1955. He wrote his senior thesis on the American attitudes towards Soviet power. When Graham was a senior in Princeton, he applied and was accepted to Harvard Law School but decided to go to L'Institut des Sciences Politiques in Paris for a year between college and law school. Before attending Harvard, Graham joined the United States Army from 1956 to 1958. At the time, he was interested in becoming a lawyer for a Middle East oil company and in the summer of 1958 took an intensive Arabic language course at Harvard University. While at Harvard Law School he took then professor Henry Kissinger's seminar on defense policy and administration. He graduated from Harvard with a J.D. in 1961.

== Career ==
Following Graham's law school graduation, he was offered a clerkship with Chief Judge Wilbur Miller of the Circuit Court of appeals for the District of Columbia. In early 1962, congressman Brent Spence offered Graham the position of the United States House Committee on Banking and Currency (now known as the United States House Committee on Financial Services) for the balance of that year. In 1963, he was hired by Jim Saxon, the comptroller of the currency at the U.S. Dept. of the Treasury, as his legislative assistant. In 1968, Graham worked for the Nixon campaign with United Citizens for Nixon-Agnew (an organization designed to appeal to all citizens, not just Republicans). It was during this time that he ultimately decided to change his registration from Democrat to Republican. In 1969 Graham left New York where he worked for the large law firm Shearman and Sterling, and returned to Washington to re-enter government service. In September 1970, Graham began his career at the Arms Control and Disarmament Agency (ACDA) and worked for that agency for 27 years.

In 2010, Thomas Graham was appointed to the United Arab Emirates' international advisory board, guiding that country's nuclear energy program and holding it to the highest standards of safety, security, and non-proliferation.

Graham taught as an adjunct professor at the University of Washington, Oregon State University, Stanford University, Georgetown University, University of Virginia Law School, and the University of California at Berkeley. (Note: "Thomas Graham". huffingtonpost.com.)

== Death ==
Graham died at his home in Washington, D.C., on September 3, 2026, at the age of 92.

== Awards and honors ==
Ambassador Graham received many prestigious honors and awards, including:

- 1979 – Twice he received the Superior Honor Award and the Meritorious Honor Award from the US Arms Control Disarmament Agency (ACDA)
- 1991 – The Princeton Class of 1955 Award
- 1995 – The Trainor Award for Distinction in Diplomacy from Georgetown University
- 2007 – The 2006 World Order Under Law Award of the International Section of the American Bar Association.
- Twice he received the Distinguished Honor Award from ACDA
- The Meritorious Honor Award from the Department of State.

== Publications ==
=== Books ===
- America: The Founders' Vision, Butler Books, 2017.
- The Alternate Route: Nuclear-Weapon Free Zone, Oregon State University, 2017.
- Seeing the Light: the Case for Nuclear Power in the 21st Century, with Scott Montgomery, Cambridge University Press, 2017.
- Unending Crisis: National Security Policy after 9/11, University of Washington Press, 2012.
- Sapphire: A Tale of the Cold War, Author House, 2014.
- Preventing Catastrophe: The Use and Misuse of Intelligence in Efforts to Halt the Proliferation and Use of Weapons of Mass Destruction, with Keith Hansen, Stanford University Press, 2009.
- Spy Satellites and Other Technologies that Have Changed the Course of History, with Keith Hansen, University of Washington Press, 2007.
- Common Sense on Weapons of Mass Destruction, University of Washington Press, 2004.
- Cornerstones of Security: Arms Control and International Law in a Nuclear Era, with Damien LaVera, University of Washington Press, 2003.
- Disarmament Sketches: Three Decades of Arms Control and International Law, University of Washington Press, 2002.

=== Articles ===
- Nuclear Weapons and a Different World. Sandia National Laboratory, Albuquerque, New Mexico. December 2016.
- Nonproliferation: The American Way, with Christopher Ford, Security Index, PIR Center—The Russian Center for Policy Studies, Number 1 (102), Winter 2013.
- The Nuclear Nonproliferation Treaty Under Threat: Iran and North Korea, Baker Center of Applied Public Policy, Volume IV, Number 1, Spring 2012.
- Establishing Balance in the NPT, Nonproliferation Review, volume 19, number 1, March 2012.
- 123 Agreement for Nuclear Energy in the UAE: An Unprecedented and Responsible Step. The Huffington Post, 2009.
- Nuclear Testing and Proliferation- An Inextricable Connection, with David Hafmeister, Disarmament Diplomacy, the Acronym Institute for Disarmament Diplomacy, No. 91, Summer 2009.
- Nuclear Weapons: An Existential Threat to Humanity, with Ambassador Max Kampelman, CTBTO Magazine Issue 11, September 2008.
- NASA's Flimsy Argument for Nuclear Weapons, with Russell L. Schweickart, Scientific American, Volume 298, Number 3, March, 2008.
- The Lost Chance, with Michael Howard, Newsweek Magazine, January 2008.
- Nuclear Weapons: A Perspective in 2007, the Baker Center Journal of Applied Public Policy, Howard H. Baker Jr. Center of Public Policy at the University of Tennessee, Knoxville, Volume 1, Number 1, Fall 2007.
- Beyond Preventive War; Revigorating Non-proliferation, Current History, Philadelphia, PA, Volume 104, Number 681, April 2005.
- An NPT for Non-members, with Avner Cohen, Bulletin of the Atomic Scientists, Volume 60, November 3, May–June, 2004.
- National Self-Defense, International Law, and Weapons of Mass Destruction, Chicago Journal of International Law, The University of Chicago Law School, Volume 4, Number 1, Spring 2003.
- A Pretty Poor Posture For a Superpower, with Robert S. McNamara, Los Angeles Times, Wednesday March 11, 2003, pg. B-13
- Beware of Fracturing Peace in Space, Thomas Graham Jr., The Globe and the Mail, Toronto, April 2002.
- Biological Weapons and International Law, Science Magazine, March 29, 2002.
- Nuclear Arms Still Keep the Peace, with Robert S. McNamara, op-ed page, New York Times, July 15, 2001.
