= BGM-109G Gryphon =

Ground-launched variant of the Tomahawk cruise missile

BGM-109G Gryphon (GLCM)
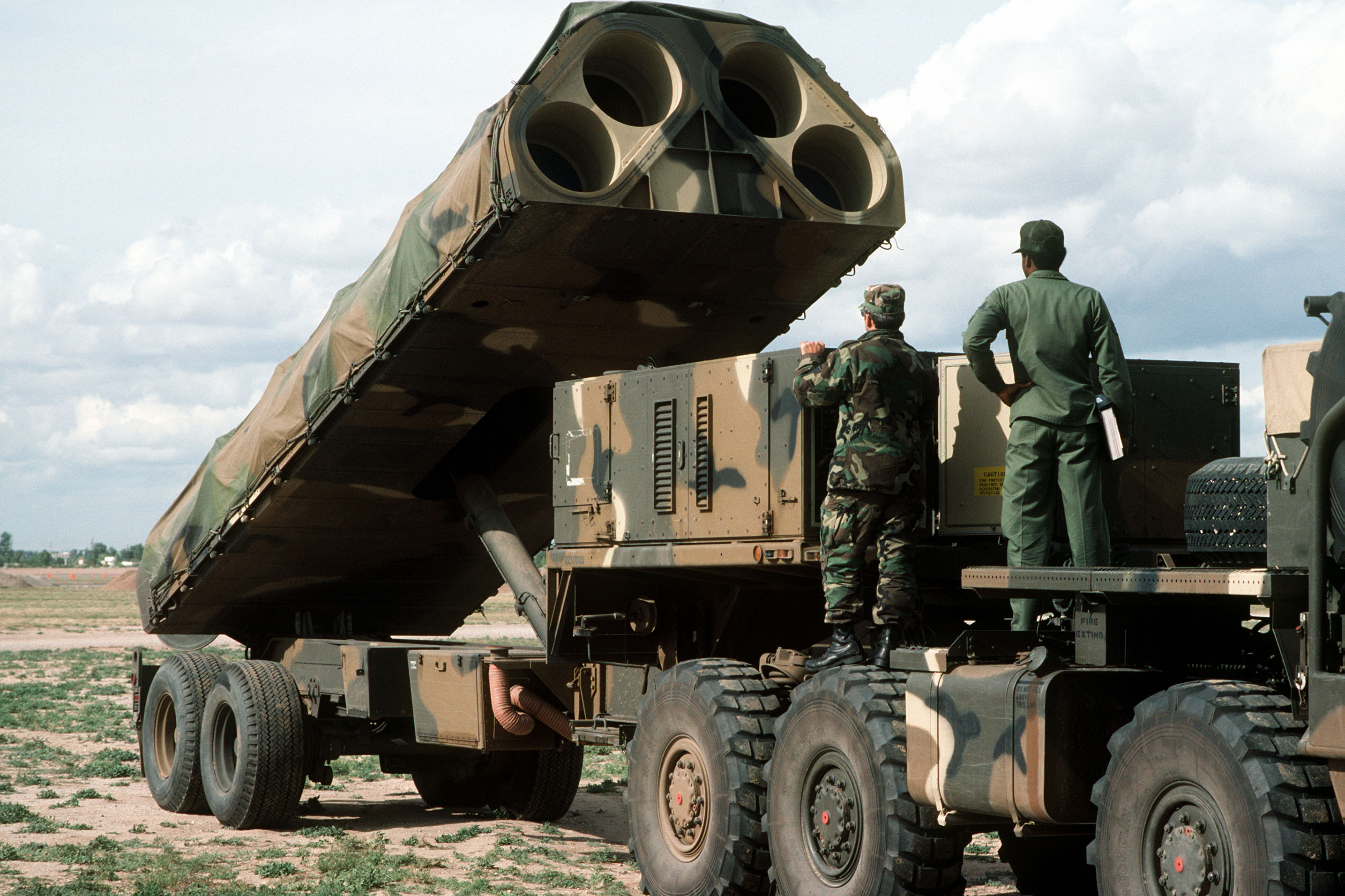
- BGM-109G Gryphon transporter–erector–launcher (TEL) showing 4 missile launch tubes
- Type: long-range, all-weather, subsonic tactical/strategic cruise missile

Service history
- In service: 1983–1991

Production history
- Manufacturer: General Dynamics
- Unit cost: $1.3 million

Specifications
- Mass: 1,200 kilograms (2,600 lb)
- Length: Without booster: 5.56 metres (18.2 ft)
- Diameter: 0.52 metres (1.7 ft)
- Wingspan: 2.67 metres (8.8 ft)
- Warhead: W84 thermonuclear warhead
- Engine: Williams International F107-WR-400 turbofan using TH-dimer fuel and a solid-fuel booster
- Operational range: 2,780 kilometres (1,730 mi)
- Maximum speed: Subsonic—880 kilometres per hour (550 mph)
- Guidance system: Inertial, TERCOM
- Launch platform: Transporter erector launcher

The BGM-109G Gryphon ground-launched cruise missile, or GLCM, was a ground-launched variant of the Tomahawk cruise missile developed by the United States Air Force in the last decade of the Cold War and disarmed under the Intermediate-Range Nuclear Forces Treaty.

== Overview ==
The BGM-109G was developed as a counter to the mobile MRBM and IRBM nuclear missiles (SS-20 Saber) deployed by the Soviet Union in Eastern Bloc European countries. The GLCM and the U.S. Army's Pershing II may have been the incentives that fostered Soviet willingness to sign the Intermediate-Range Nuclear Forces Treaty (INF treaty), and thus possibly reduced the threat of nuclear wars in Europe. GLCM is also a generic term for any ground-launched cruise missile. Since the U.S. deployed only one modern cruise missile in the tactical role, the GLCM name stuck. The GLCM was built by General Dynamics.

== History ==
=== Design and employment ===
A conventionally configured cruise missile, the BGM-109 was essentially a small, pilotless flying machine, powered by a turbofan engine. Unlike ballistic missiles, whose aimpoint is usually determined by gravitic trajectories, a cruise missile is capable of complicated aerial manoeuvres, and can fly a range of predetermined flight plans. Also, it flies at much lower altitudes than a ballistic missile, typically with a terrain-hugging flight plan. The trade-off for this low-observability flight is strike time; cruise missiles travel far more slowly than a ballistic weapon, and the GLCM was typical in this regard.

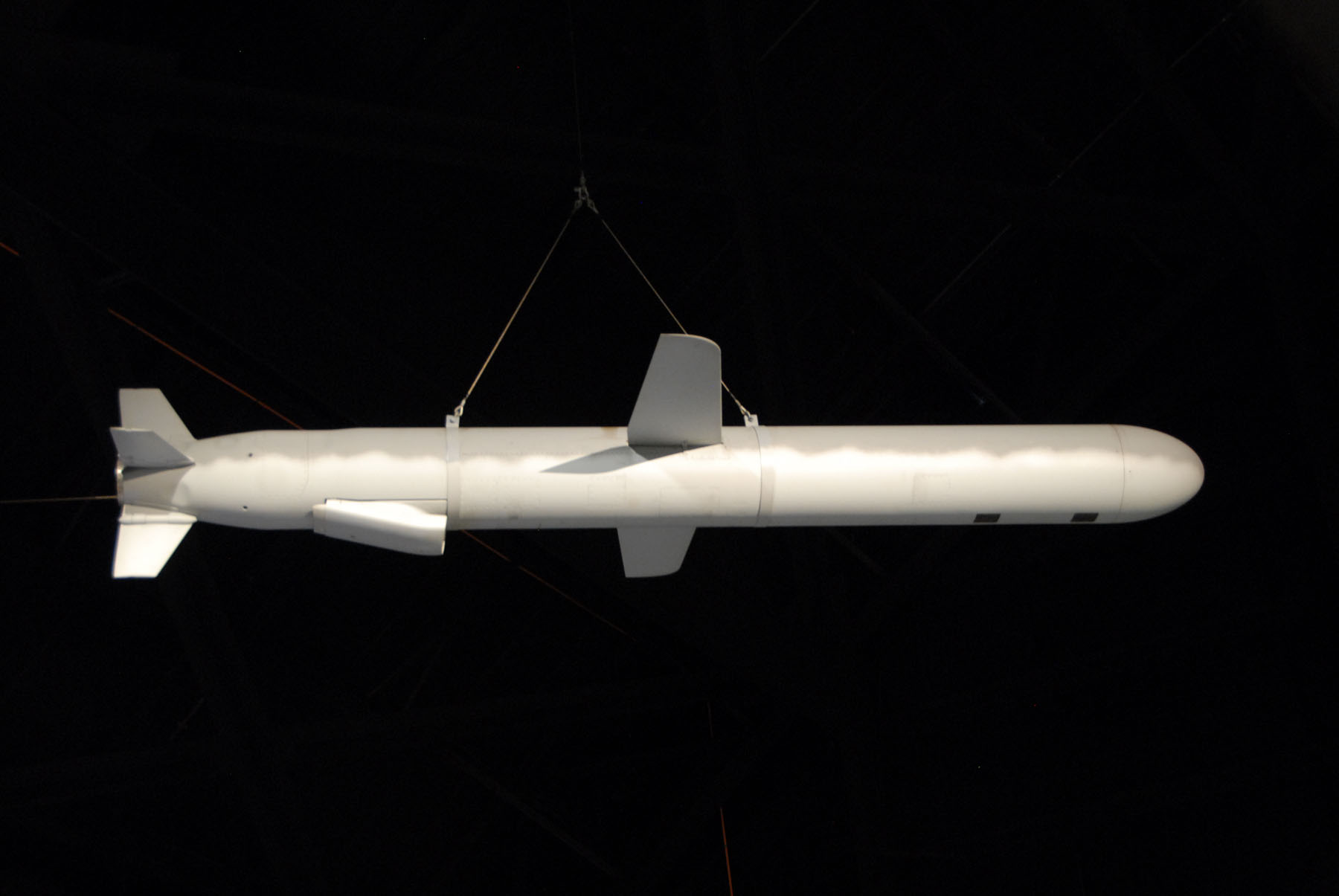
BGM-109G on display at the National Museum of US Air Force

GLCM was developed as a ground-launched variant of the Tomahawk cruise missile in use by the U.S. Navy (along with an undeveloped air-launched version, the Medium Range Air to Surface Missile (MRASM)). Unlike other variants of the Tomahawk, the GLCM carried only a W84 thermonuclear warhead; no conventional capability was provided. The W84 warhead is a 0.2–150kt variable-yield weapon. This yield contrasts with the yield of the W80 warhead found on other versions of the Tomahawk and on the ALCM from which the W84 was derived, which has a selectable yield of 5 or 150 kt. The official range of the weapon was 2,780 kilometres (1,730 mi). Like other U.S. cruise missiles of this period, accuracy after more than 2000 km of flight was approximately 30 meters. The missile was entirely subsonic, powered by a turbofan engine with a rocket booster assisting at launch.

Militarily, the GLCM was targeted against fixed targets—at the outer edge of its range, the missile's flight time with its subsonic turbofan was more than 2 1/2 hours. The missiles were launched from an elevated launcher, with the missile ejected from its canister for about 13 seconds of solid rocket booster flight. The fins extended at 4 seconds, the air inlet and wings deployed at 10 seconds and the jet engine started at the end of the boost phase. Flying at a low level, the missile was guided by TERCOM (terrain contour matching) to the target.

This contrasted strongly with Pershing II, which had a flight time of 10–15 minutes. However, the range of the GLCM gave it the ability to strike deep within then-Soviet territory, and the missile guidance and low radar cross-section would have made it far more difficult to intercept a GLCM even if the launch was detected in time. (Note: The Mikoyan MiG-31's Zaslon radar has look-down/shoot-down function, and was specifically designed to intercept low-flying bombers and cruise missiles. Same radar function on the Beriev A-50.)

BGM-109G personnel were trained at Davis-Monthan Air Force Base, Arizona, by the 868th Tactical Missile Training Squadron from 1 July 1981. On 1 October 1985, the squadron became part of the 868th Tactical Missile Training Group. The group and squadron were inactivated on 31 May 1990. An area near Fort Huachuca, Arizona was used for field training for GLCM flights. GLCM testing was conducted at the Dugway Proving Ground in Utah, with many of the people involved in the testing going to operational wings as they were activated.

=== NATO deployment and protests ===
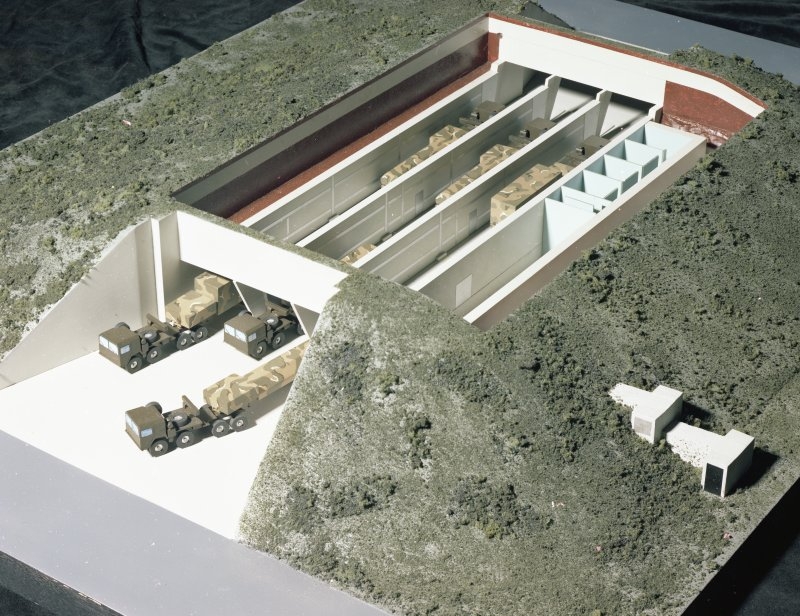
Diorama of a ground-launched cruise missile GAMA (GLCM Alert and Maintenance Area)

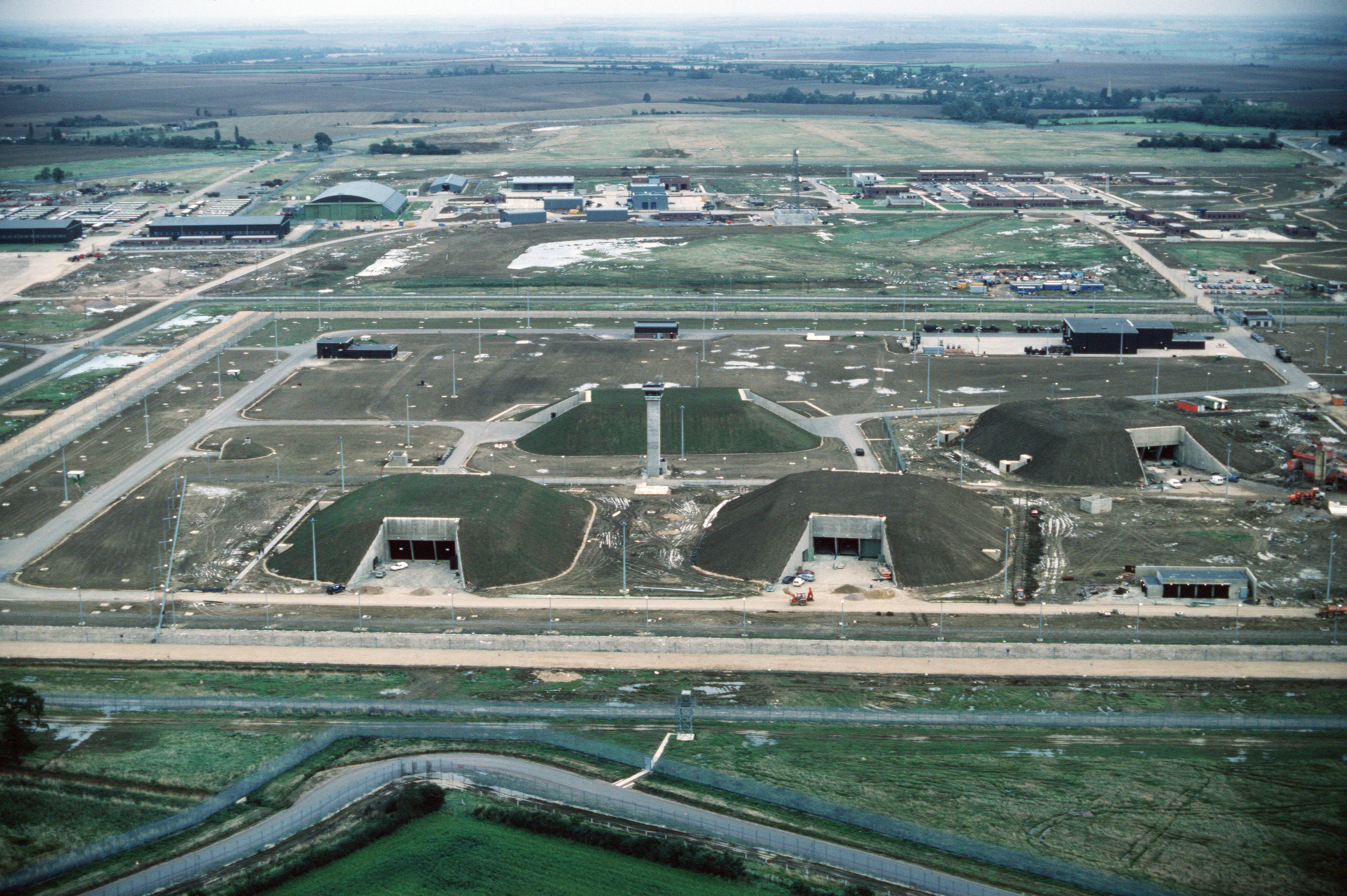
GAMAs at RAF Molesworth, England. 4 GAMAs, 1 per flight, each holding 16 missiles, a total 64 missiles. Molesworth was completely reconstructed between 1981 and 1985, being transformed from a largely abandoned World War II Eighth Air Force B-17 base to a modern NATO facility. The large World War II "J" type hangar in the upper left was retained as a memorial to the World War II 303d Bombardment Group. Both Bob Hope and Glenn Miller performed USO shows in that hangar during the war years.

BGM-109G missiles would be based at six locations throughout Europe; in the United Kingdom (at RAF Greenham Common and RAF Molesworth), Belgium, Woensdrecht AB Netherlands, Germany, and Comiso Air Station in Italy. Each location had its own unique problems, but all required extensive construction by the USAF. Initial operating capability (IOC) occurred in 1983.

Normal basing was in blast shelters at military installations. Each BGM-109G station was controlled by a Wing that consisted of a Tactical Missile Squadron (TMS), which was responsible for operation and deployment of the missiles; and a Tactical Missile Maintenance Squadron (TMMS), which was responsible for the support of the system. Each TMS consisted of several flights, made up of 69 people and 22 vehicles. The missile was designed to operate in a flight with sixteen missiles. The flight would be normally on base, with the missiles and vehicles secured in the hardened storage area called the GAMA (GLCM Alert and Maintenance Area).

Four transporter erector launchers (TEL) each carried four BGM-109G missiles in their containers and ready for launch. Two launch control centers (LCC), each with two launch officers, were connected to the TELs and interconnected for launch. Each TEL and LCC was towed by a large MAN KAT1 8×8 tractor and was capable of traversing rough terrain. There were 16 support vehicles for the flight commander, normally a captain, 19 maintenance technicians, a medical technician and 44 security personnel.

During periods of increased tension, the flights would be deployed to pre-surveyed, classified locations in the countryside away from the base. The members of the flight would dig in, erect camouflage netting to hide the vehicles, and prepare for launch. Flight commanders were tasked to survey and select possible deployment sites, with all details closely held, and the commander selected the location preferred when the flight deployed from the base. When deployed, the flight was self-sustaining, and secured with special intrusion detection radar. The launchers (without warheads) were sent out on a number of simulated scrambles.

Although deployed in the face of a range of Soviet IRBMs, including the brand-new and extremely capable SS-20 Saber, the GLCM (sometimes referred to by its phonetic nickname, Glick-em) faced widespread public protest in Europe. Anti-nuclear groups such as the Campaign for Nuclear Disarmament felt that the United States was deploying weapons meant to win a tactical nuclear war, without adequate consideration of the effects that even a 'victory' would bring. Between them, GLCM and Pershing II made a lethal combination. GLCM missiles could be launched, undetected, followed 2 hours later by a Pershing strike, which would fly so quickly that it was possible no response could be made before the Pershings struck. Aside from presenting a course of action to NATO commanders in the event of war, it put the Kremlin leaders (in range of the GLCM and possibly the Pershing, even in Moscow) in a position of fearing a decapitating NATO first strike, which could have moved them toward a launch on warning policy as the only way to maintain mutually assured destruction. However, the USSR did have submarine-launched missiles (i.e. Golf and Hotel class SSBNs armed with R-27 Zyb and SS-N-5s) available during this time, so any fears of a decapitating first strike were not necessarily justified.

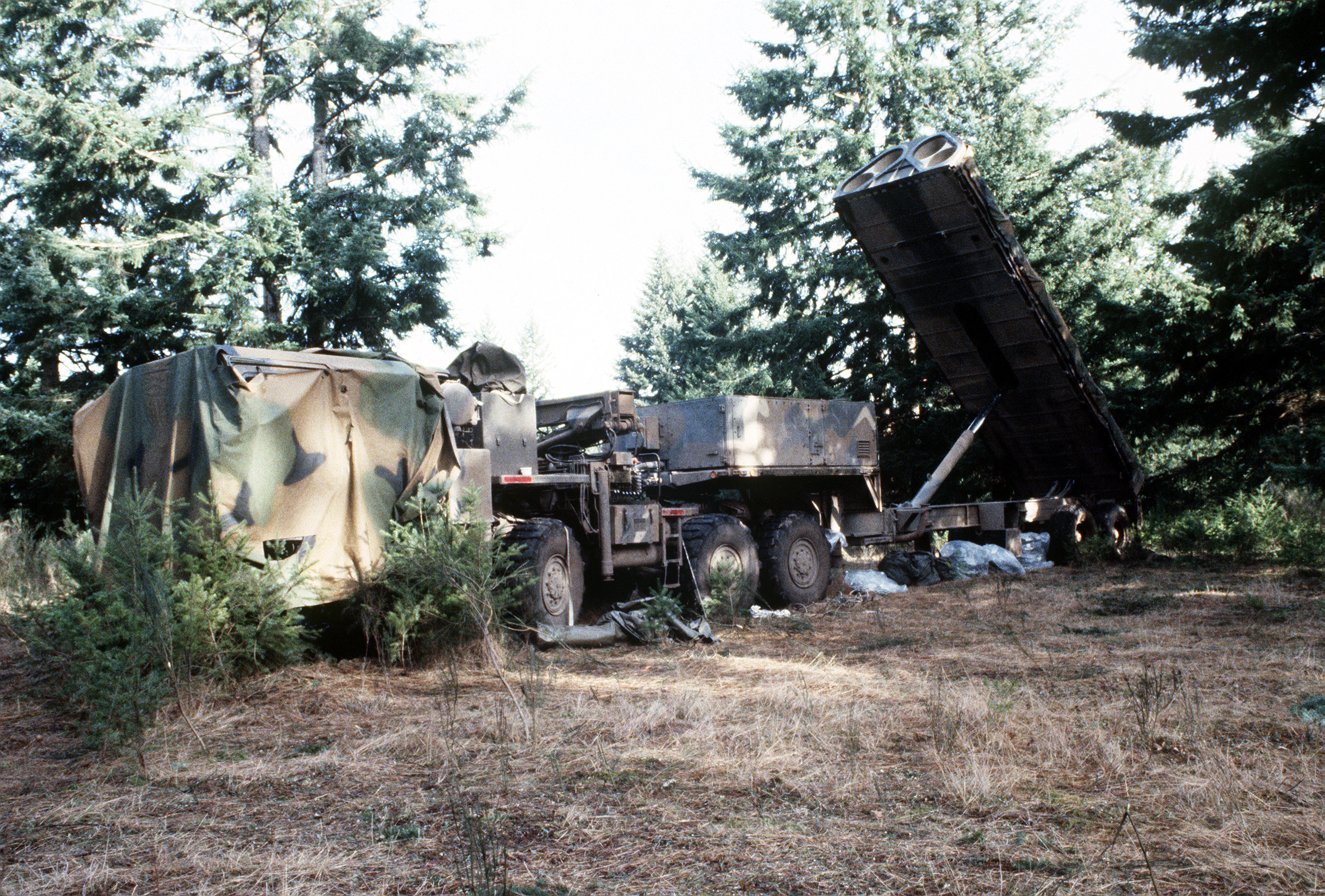
A dispersed launch site for a BGM-109G Gryphon missile TEL

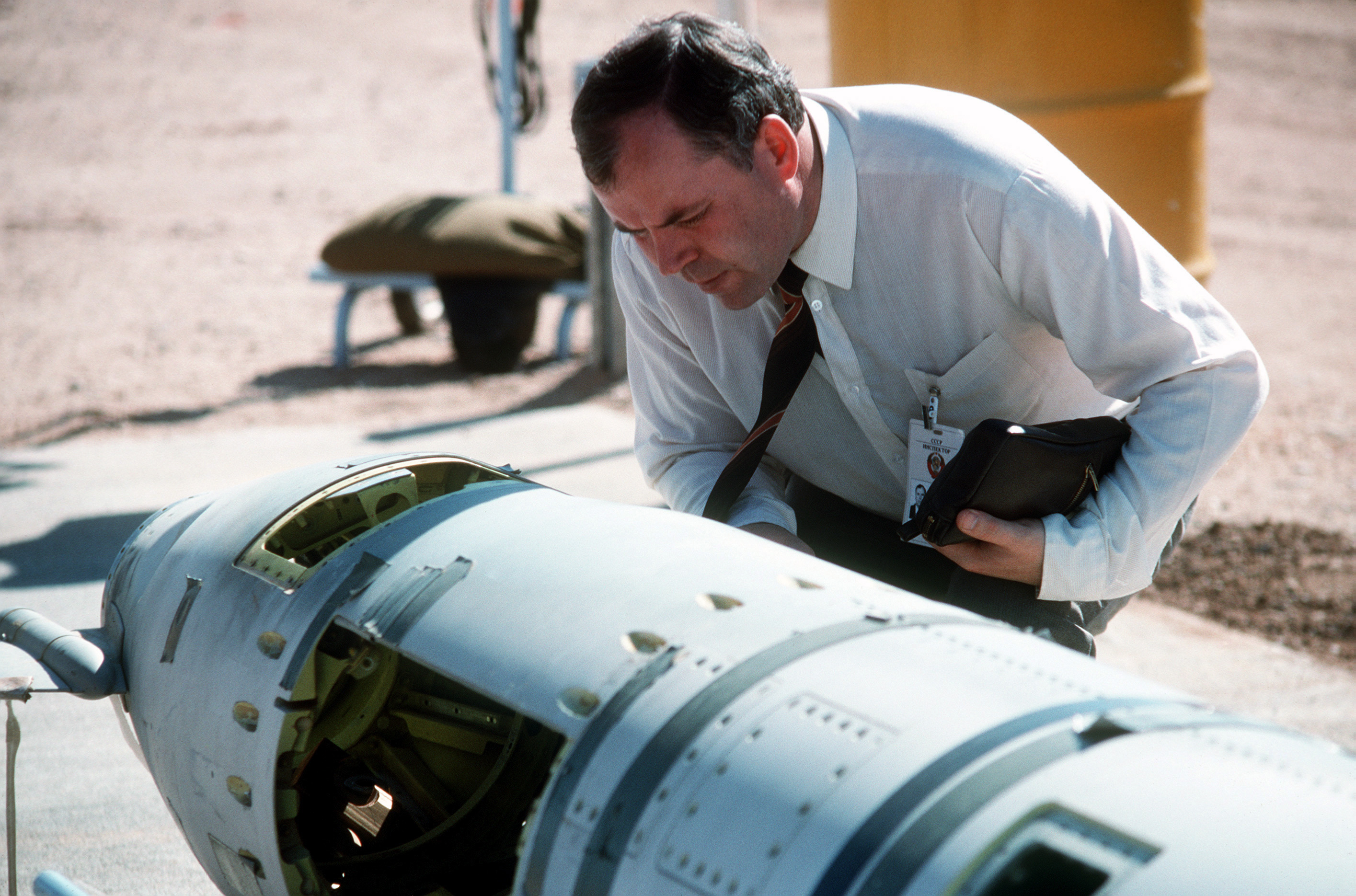
A Soviet inspector examines a BGM-109G ground-launched cruise missile in 1988 prior to its destruction.

=== Intermediate-Range Nuclear Forces Treaty ===
Despite initial fears of greater instability, the deployment of GLCM ultimately caused Soviet leaders to enter into negotiations for, and finally, sign off on, the INF treaty. The recognition by Soviet leaders of the threat posed by the GLCM and Pershing II missiles made them far more inclined to agree to negotiate their own intermediate-range weapons, especially the SS-20, out of service, in exchange for the elimination of the threat posed by the GLCM and the Pershing II.

Unlike SALT II or START I, which set limits to maximum nuclear arsenals, the INF Treaty banned whole categories of intermediate-range tactical nuclear weapons outright. All ground-launched cruise missiles and ballistic missiles with ranges greater than 500 but less than 5500 kilometers were barred to the U.S. and USSR under this treaty. This meant the withdrawal of GLCM and Pershing II on the American side. The Soviets withdrew the GLCM's most direct counterpart, the SSC-4 or RK-55, and its supersonic follow-on, the SSC-X-5. In addition, various Soviet MRBMs and IRBMs were withdrawn: the SS-4 Sandal, SS-5 Skean, SS-12 Scaleboard, SS-20 Saber, SS-22 Scaleboard B, and SS-23 Spider. All of these equivalent weapons had been developed and deployed against NATO forces before the introduction of the GLCM, despite the categorization of the GLCM deployment by communists as 'aggressive'.

GLCM was removed from Europe beginning in 1988, and over the next three and a half years all units were transported to Davis Monthan AFB and destroyed or converted into displays by 1991. Eight missiles survive for inert static display only.

In February 2018, U.S. military officials confirmed they were developing a new ground-launched, intermediate-range cruise missile to counter Russian development of a similar weapon system that violates the INF Treaty. President Donald Trump announced on 20 October 2018 that he was withdrawing the U.S. from the INF treaty, citing Russian non-compliance. The United States formally withdrew from the treaty on 2 August 2019.

=== USAF BGM-109G GLCM units ===
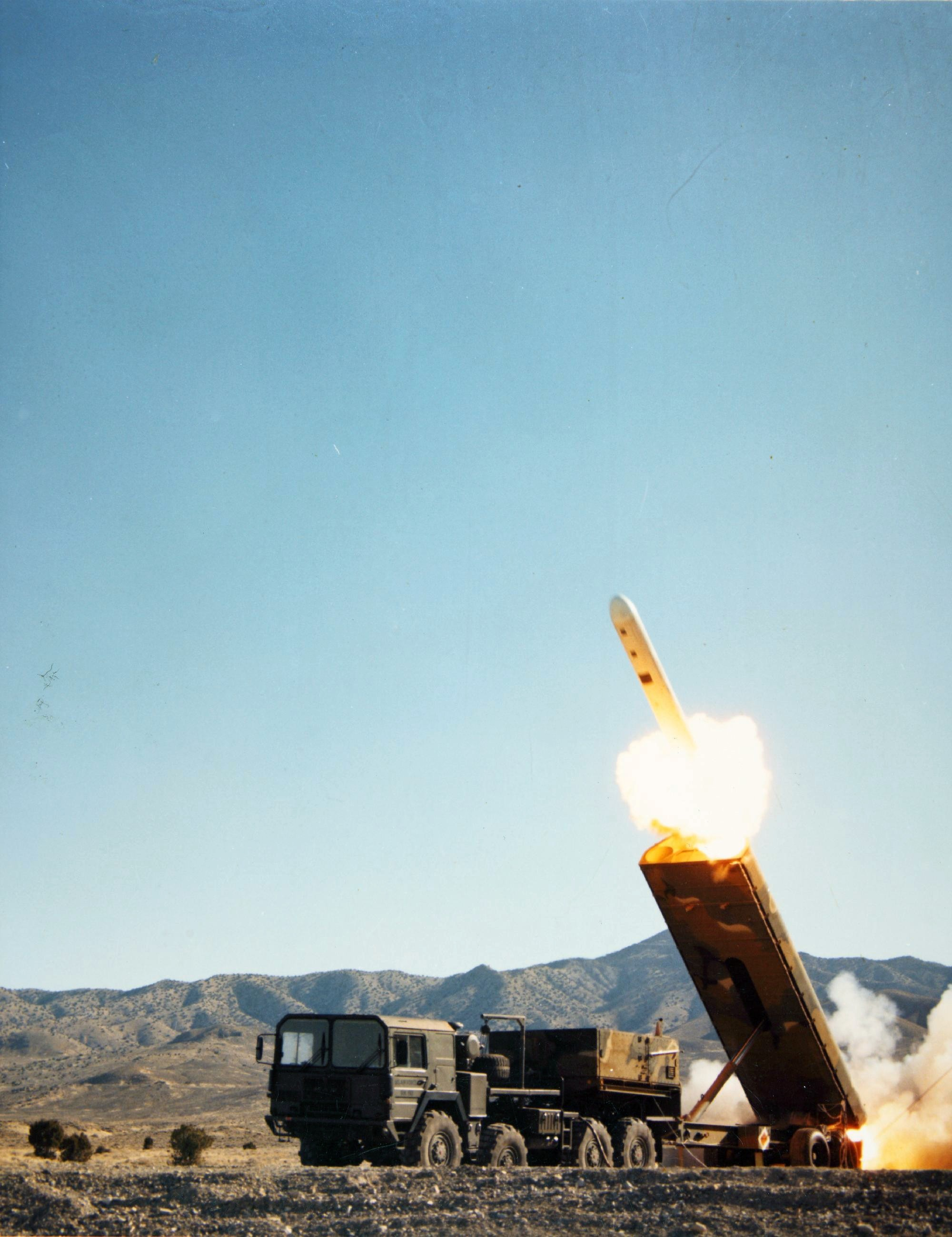
Test launch of a BGM-109G in 1979

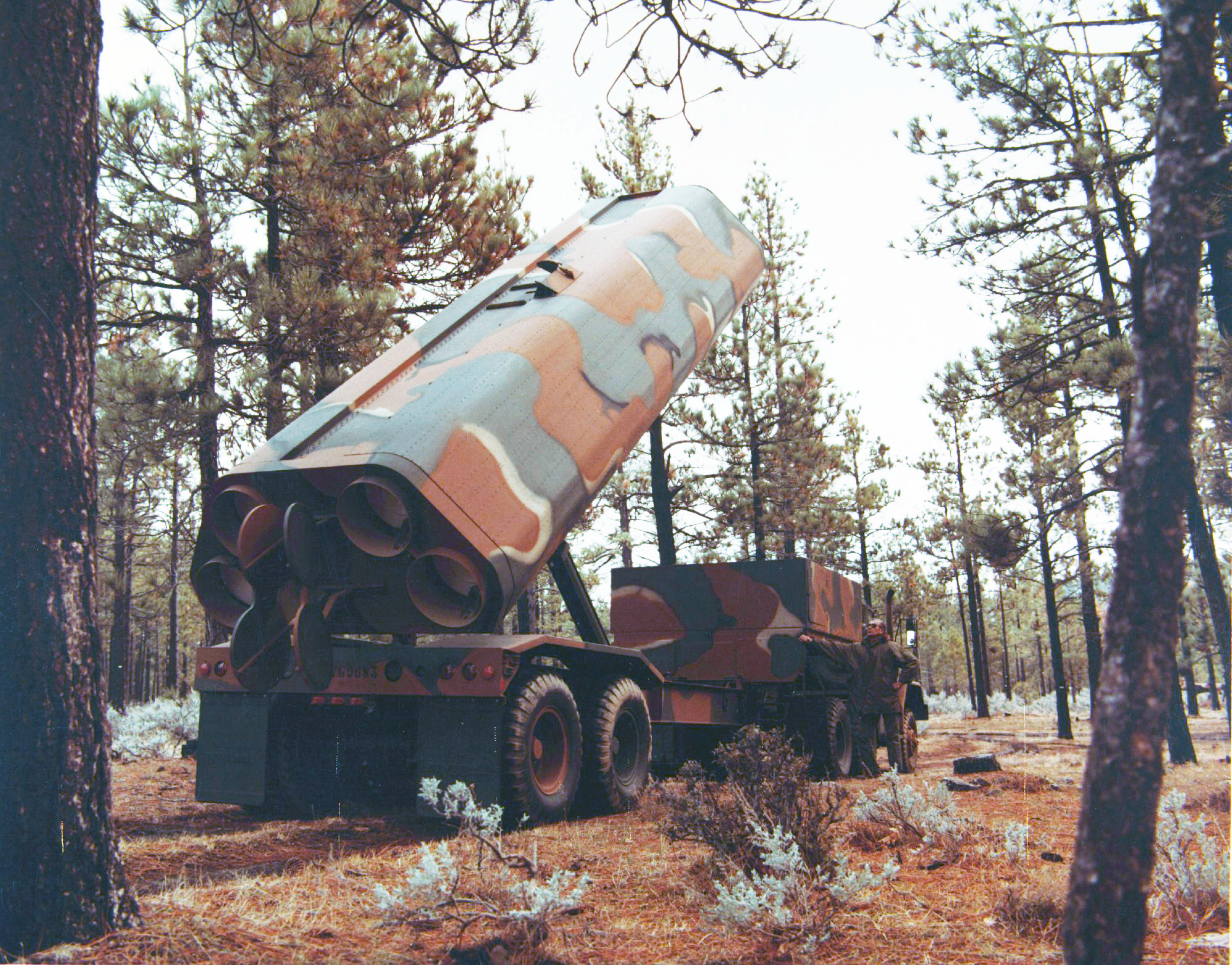
Rear of a BGM-109G TEL

- 38th Tactical Missile Wing - Pydna Missile Base at Wüschheim AB, West Germany (1985–1990)

89th TMS (80 missiles) 50°02′37″N 007°25′32″E

- 303d Tactical Missile Wing - RAF Molesworth, United Kingdom (1986–1989)

87th TMS (64 missiles) 52°22′55″N 000°25′41″W

- 485th Tactical Missile Wing - Florennes Air Base, Belgium (1984–1989)

71st TMS (48 missiles) 50°13′34″N 004°39′01″E

- 486th Tactical Missile Wing - Woensdrecht Air Base, Netherlands (1987–1988)

No Tactical Missile Squadron assigned (48 missiles assigned/0 Deployed)51°26′21″N 004°21′09″E

- 487th Tactical Missile Wing - Comiso Air Base, Italy (1983–1991)

302d TMS (112 missiles) 36°59′42″N 014°36′48″E

- 501st Tactical Missile Wing - RAF Greenham Common, United Kingdom (1982–1991)

11th TMS (96 missiles) 51°22′42″N 001°18′07″W

- 868th Tactical Missile Training Squadron, Activated 1 July 1981

Assigned to 868th Tactical Missile Training Group, 1 October 1985
Components: 868th TM Training Squadron, 868th TM Maintenance Squadron, 868th Student Squadron
Davis-Monthan AFB, Arizona, inactivated on 31 May 1990
An area near Fort Huachuca was used for field training for GLCM operations.

Note: Each GLCM squadron was further subdivided into several flights. Each flight included 2 Launch Control Vehicles (LCC) and 4 Transporter Erector Launchers (TEL), totalling 16 missiles per flight. Each TEL could carry 4 missiles.

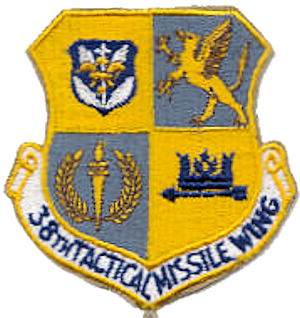
38th Tactical Missile Wing

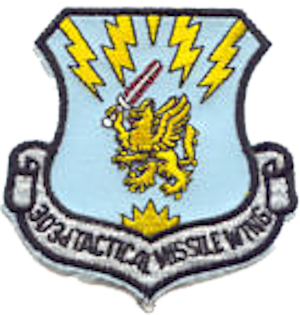
303d Tactical Missile Wing

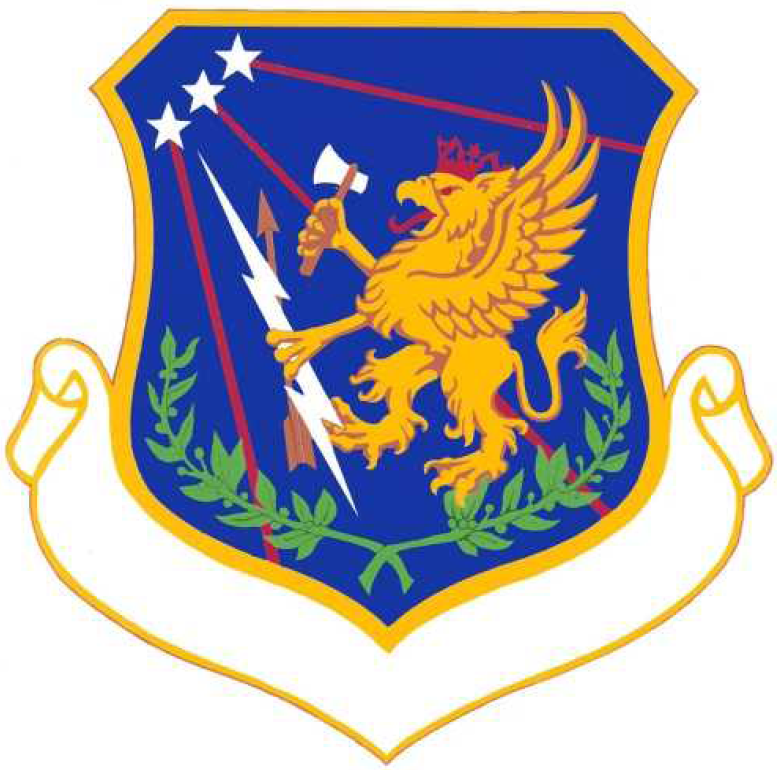
485th Tactical Missile Wing

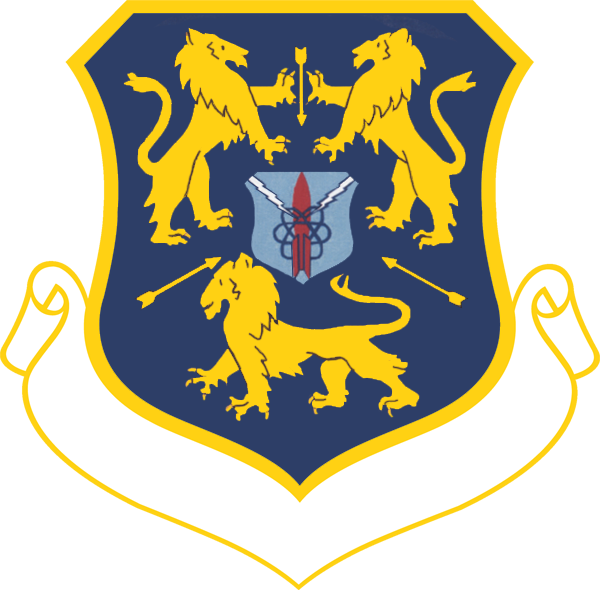
486th Tactical Missile Wing

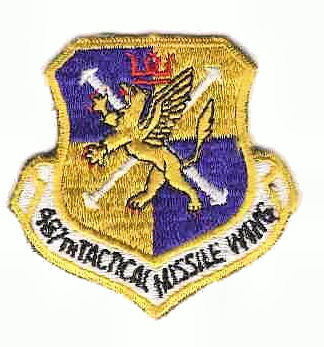
487th Tactical Missile Wing

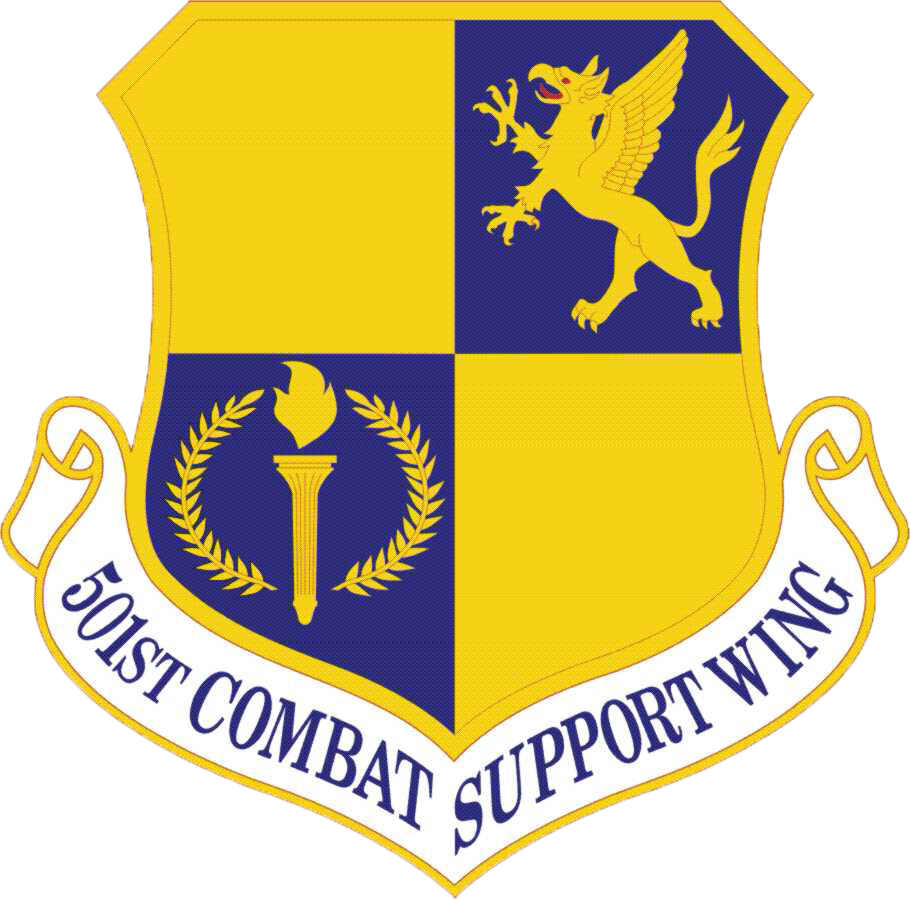
501st Tactical Missile Wing

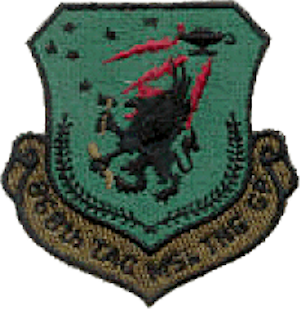
868th Tactical Missile Training Group

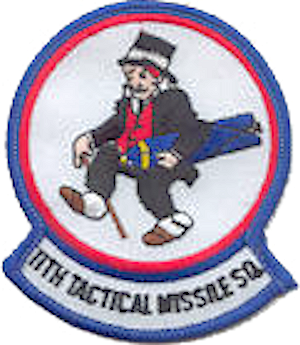
11th Tactical Missile Squadron

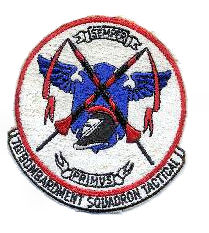
71st Tactical Missile Squadron

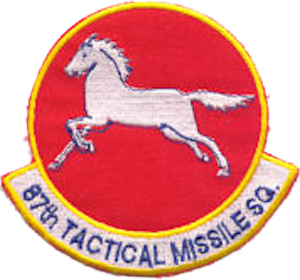
87th Tactical Missile Squadron

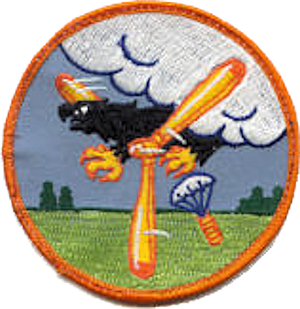
89th Tactical Missile Squadron

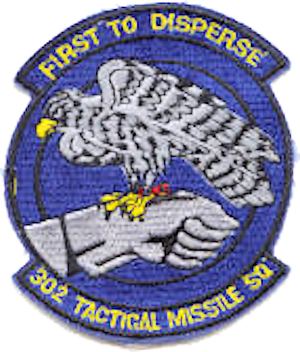
302d Tactical Missile Squadron

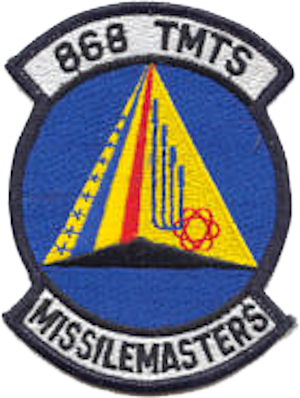
868th Tactical Missile Training Squadron

== See also ==
- Typhon missile launcher
- Tomahawk SLCM
- SSC-X-4/RK-55
- List of nuclear weapons

== Bibliography ==
- Cochran, Thomas; Arkin, William M.; Hoenig, Milton M. (1984). Nuclear Weapons Databook Volume I: U.S. Nuclear Forces and Capabilities. Natural Resources Defense Council. ISBN 0-88410-173-8.
- Colbourn, Susan (2022). Euromissiles: The Nuclear Weapons That Nearly Destroyed NATO. Ithaca, New York: Cornell University Press. ISBN 978-1501766022.
