= 405th Tactical Missile Squadron =

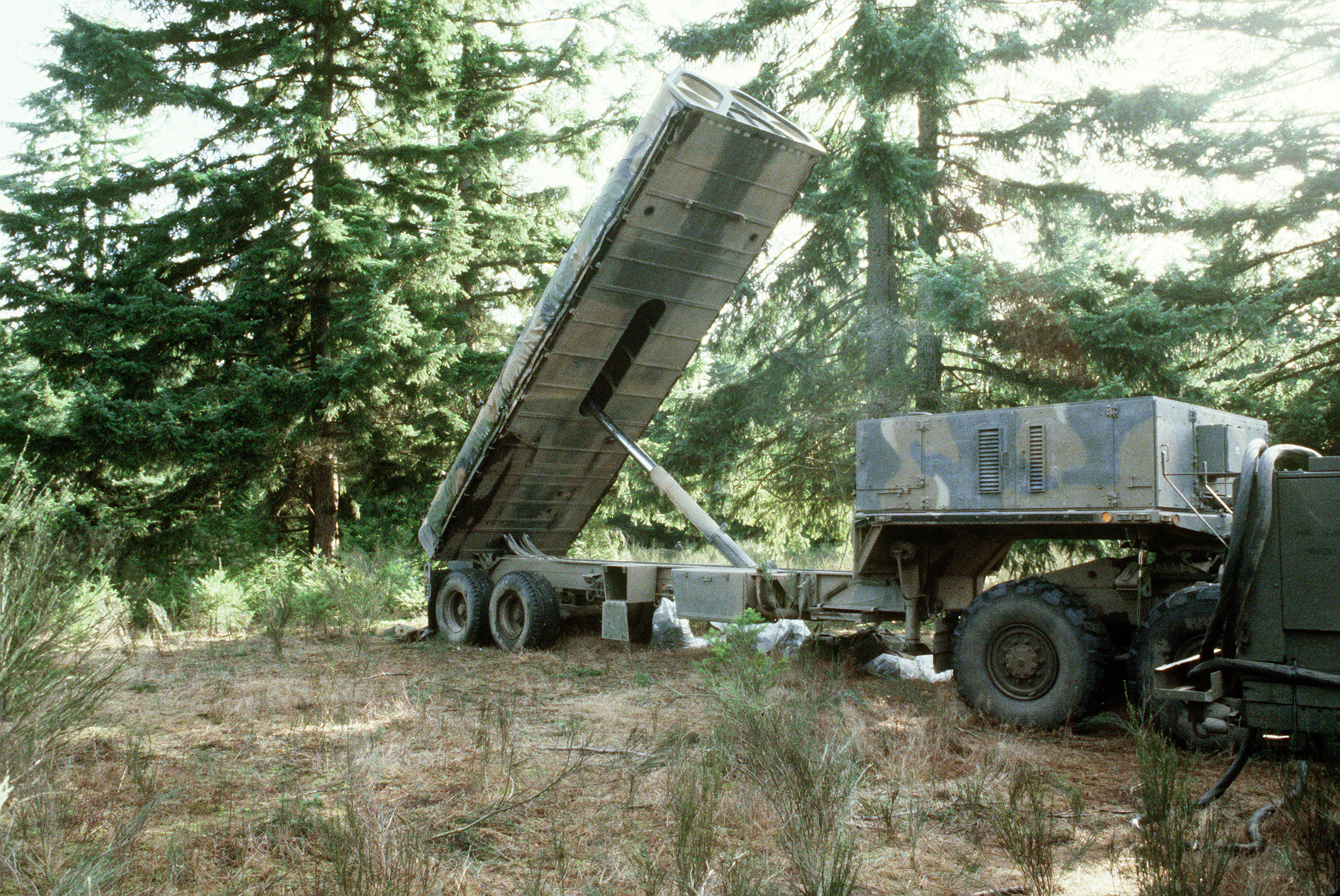
- BGM-109G Gryphon missile ready to fire
- Active: 1941–1949; 1953–1966; 1987–1988
- Country: United States
- Branch: United States Air Force
- Role: Tactical missile
- Nickname: Green Dragons
- Engagements: Southwest Pacific Theater
- Decorations: Distinguished Unit Citation; Air Force Outstanding Unit Award; Philippine Presidential Unit Citation

Commanders
- Notable commanders: Ralph Cheli

Insignia
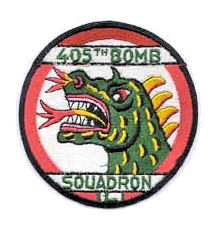
- 405th Tactical Missile Squadron emblem (Note: Approved 17 June 1954. Description: On a white disc with a dark red border, a head and neck of a mythical dragon, green with yellow highlights. Yellow and red flames issuing from his nostril, dark red mouth with white fangs and a medium red barbed tongue, dark red eye with black pupil and white highlight, spines on back yellow and dark red; the monster outlined in black. This emblem is based on the emblem used unofficially during World War II. Watkins, p. 78.)

The 405th Tactical Missile Squadron is an inactive United States Air Force unit. It was first organized in January 1941 as the 15th Reconnaissance Squadron. In early 1942, shortly after the attack on Pearl Harbor, the squadron's ground echelon moved to reinforce American forces in Australia, although the air echelon remained in the United States for additional training until August. While completing its training, the unit was redesignated the 405th Bombardment Squadron. The squadron moved forward through New Guinea and the Philippines, earning three Distinguished Unit Citations for its combat actions, operating from Okinawa in the closing month of the war. Following V-J Day, it moved to Japan and became part of the occupation forces until inactivating in April 1949.

It was reactivated in France in January 1953, when it took over the personnel and equipment of an Air National Guard unit that had been called to active service for the Korean War. In June 1958, it moved to Germany, where, as the 405th Tactical Missile Squadron, it assumed the resources of another unit, which was inactivated. It was inactivated in September 1966 as the Air Force withdrew most of its missiles from Europe. It was activated again from August 1987 to September 1988 as a Ground Launched Cruise Missile squadron, but was inactivated at Woensdrecht Air Base, Netherlands with the implementation of the Intermediate-Range Nuclear Forces Treaty.

== History ==
=== World War II ===
==== Initial organization and training ====
The squadron was first activated on 15 January 1941 at Langley Field, Virginia as the 15th Reconnaissance Squadron. Manned like the three bombardment squadrons of the 38th Bombardment Group, to which it was attached, it was designated for the long range reconnaissance mission. While it was assigned to a higher echelon, it was attached to the 38th Group. Since a reorganization of General Headquarters Air Force in September 1936, each bombardment group of the Army Air Forces (AAF) had an attached reconnaissance squadron, which operated the same aircraft as that group's assigned bombardment squadrons. That arrangement continued for units like the 38th that were designated as medium units. The squadron trained with Martin B-26 Marauders, but also flew Douglas B-18 Bolos. In June 1941, the squadron moved to Jackson Army Air Base, Mississippi.

Shortly after the attack on Pearl Harbor, on 19 January 1942, the ground echelon of the squadron departed for Australia. The air echelon remained at Jackson and continued training until the summer of 1942, converting to North American B-25 Mitchells. During this time, in February, the squadron was redesignated the 405th Bombardment Squadron and was assigned to the 38th Group.

==== Combat in the Southwest Pacific ====
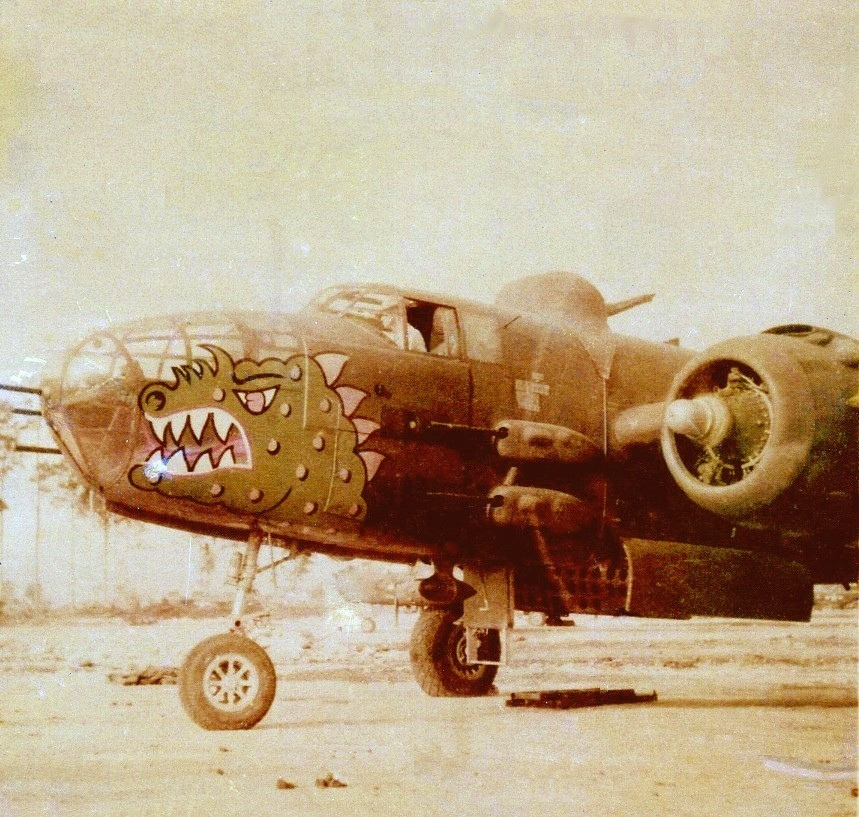
Squadron B-25 with Green Dragon nose marking

The air echelon arrived at its first combat station, Breddan Aerodrome, Queensland, Australia in early August 1942. The squadron attacked Japanese airfields and shipping, and supported ground forces in New Guinea and the Bismarck Archipelago, moving forward through New Guinea and the Netherlands East Indies. In December 1943, the squadron was awarded its first Distinguished Unit Citation (DUC) for bombing and strafing Japanese installations on Cape Gloucester on New Britain in December 1943. It earned a second DUC for missions on 16 and 17 June 1944 for missions attacking Japanese airfields, merchant ships and naval vessels in New Guinea.

The squadron moved to Pitoe Airfield, Morotai in the Maluku Islands. From this base, it bombed airfields, ground installations, harbors and shipping in the southern Philippines to support the invasion of Leyte. It was awarded a third DUC for strikes on a large enemy convoy at Ormoc Bay on 10 November that prevented the landing of supplies and reinforcements, that were critical to the outcome of the Battle of Leyte.

In January 1945, the squadron moved to Lingayen Airfield, on Luzon, Philippines, from which it provided air support for American forces on Luzon, and made attacks on Formosa and enemy shipping along the coast of China. In June 1945, the squadron moved temporarily to Palawan, to provide pre-invasion bombardment in preparation for Operation Oboe, the invasion of Borneo. On 21 July 1945, the squadron moved to Okinawa, attacking industrial targets, rail transportation and shipping in southern Japan until V-J Day.

==== Medal of Honor ====
On 18 August 1943, Major Ralph Cheli was leading the squadron to attack the Dague Airdrome, a heaviily defended site on New Guinea, when enemy interceptors concentrated their fire on his aircraft, causing it to burst into flames while still two miles from the target. Maj Cheli had enough altitude and airspeed to zoom and permit his crew to safely parachute. However, this would have exposed the remainder of the squadron to the enemy and caused disorganization in its formation. He continued to lead the attack in this burning plane, and the squadron made a successful strafing and bombing attack on the airfield. Maj Cheli instructed his wingman to assume the formation lead before he crashed into the sea.

=== Occupation service ===
The squadron moved to Itazuke Airfield, Japan in November 1945, when it became part of the occupation forces. It began conversion to the Douglas A-26 Invader. In October 1946, it moved to Itami Airfield, becoming non-operational shortly after moving and becoming a paper unit. In January 1947, it returned to Itazuke and was manned and served as a basic military training unit until May 1947. Afterwards, until September 1947, it provided labor for various tasks, when manning was again withdrawn and the unit returned to Itami on paper. In December, the squadron began equipping again. However, President Truman's reduced 1949 defense budget required reductions in the number of groups in the Air Force to 48, and the squadron and 38th Group were inactivated on 1 April 1949.

=== European service ===
==== Tactical bomber ====
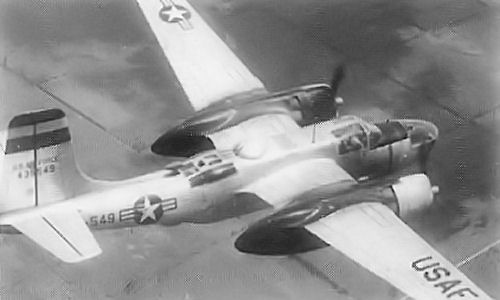
B-26 Invader of 126th Bombardment Wing

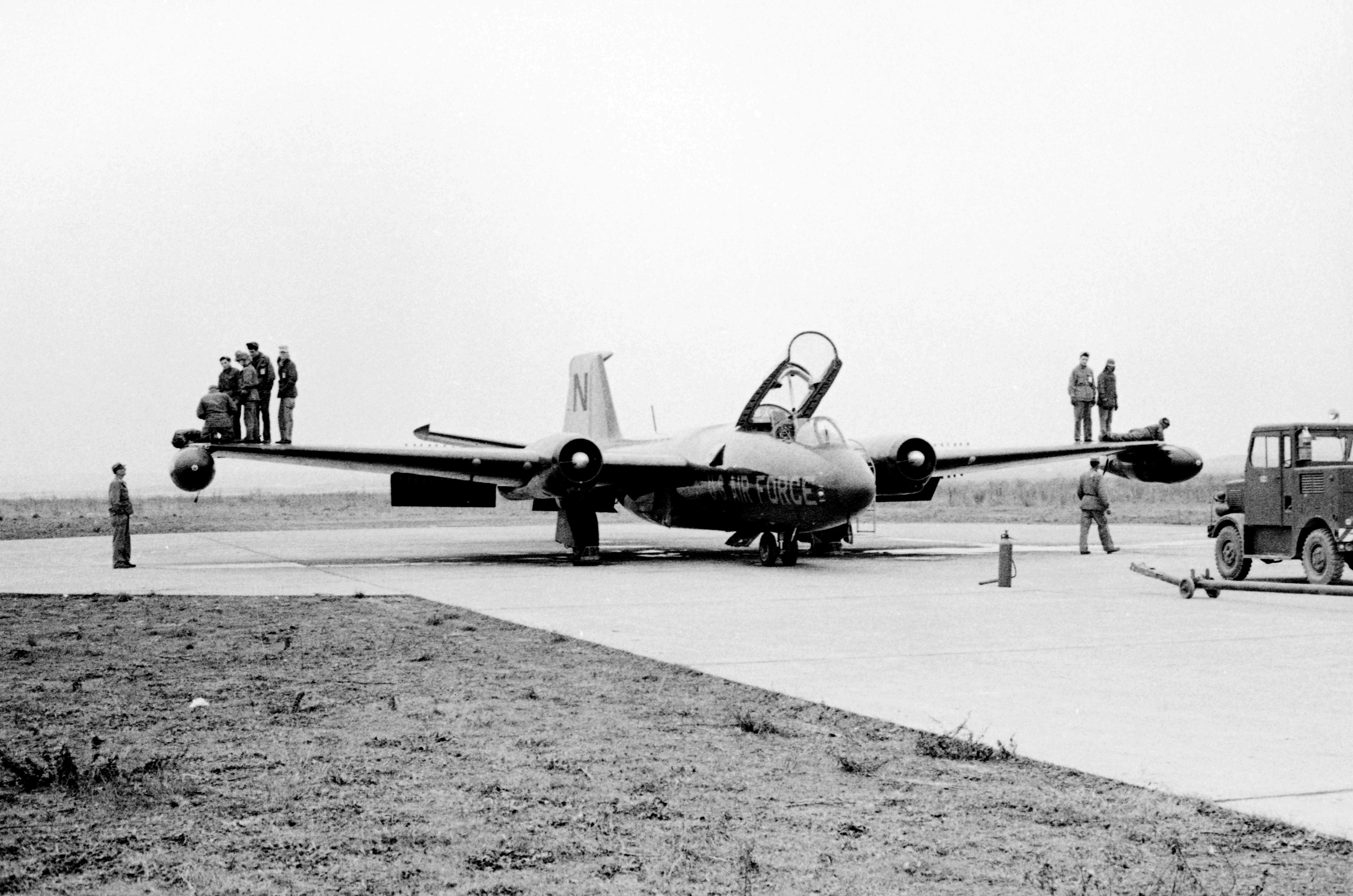
38th Bombardment Wing B-57 in France

The 126th Bombardment Wing, an Illinois Air National Guard unit that had been mobilized for the Korean War and selected to reinforce NATO, moved to Laon-Couvron Air Base, France with its Douglas B-26 Invaders in late May 1952. The installation had not been used as an airfield since 1945, when it was an Advanced Landing Ground for the Army Air Forces. However, on 1 January 1953, the 126th was returned to state control, and the 405th was activated to take over the personnel and equipment of its 168th Bombardment Squadron. The squadron mission was to fly night intruder missions, which were mostly targeted using LORAN equipment.

In February 1955, the squadron's pilots began flying jet Lockheed T-33 T-Bird trainers to prepare for the replacement of its B-26s with Martin B-57 Canberras. The T-Birds proved essential for pilot training because the squadron did not receive any dual control B-57Cs until December, after it had completed its conversion to the B-57B. Pilots scheduled to leave Laon soon continued to fly the B-26, and some returned to the United States on temporary duty for formal conversion training with the 3510th Combat Crew Training Wing at Randolph Air Force Base, Texas.

The conversion to the B-57 brought with it a new mission, the delivery of nuclear weapons. The 38th Wing maintained B-57s on alert at Laon, and also maintained a detachment at Ramstein Air Base, Germany that was manned on a 30-day rotating basis by crews temporarily stationed there. In February 1956, the squadron configured one of its B-57Bs with a Martin TM-61 Matador guidance system to evaluate the missile's performance after problems developed with the missile's AN/MSQ-1 system. These tests were performed at the test ranges at Wheelus Air Base, Libya. In December 1957, the 38th Bombardment Group was inactivated as the 38th Wing converted to the "dual deputy" system, and the squadron was assigned directly to wing headquarters. In early 1958, the squadron began transferring its B-57s back to the United States. By 18 June 1958, prompted by budget reductions and the programmed replacement of manned tactical bombers with missiles for the nuclear weapon mission, the squadron ceased bomber operations and transferred to Germany as a missile unit.

==== Tactical missile ====
===== Matador and Mace =====
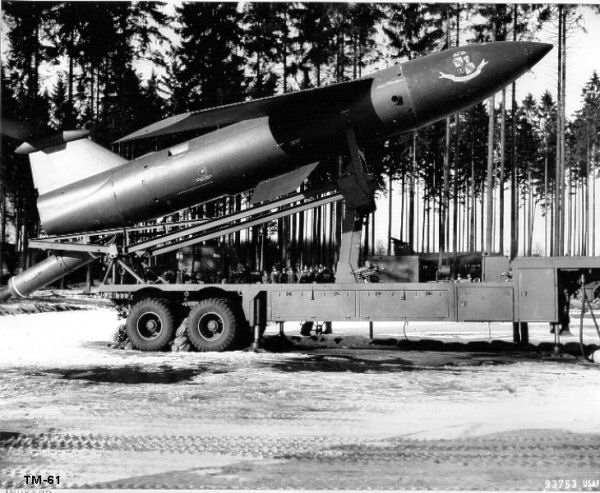
TM-61 Matador at Hahn Air Base

United States Air Forces in Europe (USAFE) had organized its TM-61 Matadors in Germany under the 701st Tactical Missile Wing in September 1956. However, the wing and its components had all been organized in the 1950s and lacked combat records. With the withdrawal of its tactical bombers, USAFE decided to replace these units with the 38th Bombardment Wing and its tactical elements. The 405th Squadron moved on paper to Hahn Air Base, Germany, where it became the 405th Tactical Missile Squadron and assumed the personnel and equipment of the 69th Tactical Missile Squadron, which was simultaneously inactivated. Because its missile units were dispersed among several German bases, each missile squadron, along with its support elements at its home station was assigned to a separate group, and the 405th became part of the 586th Tactical Missile Group.

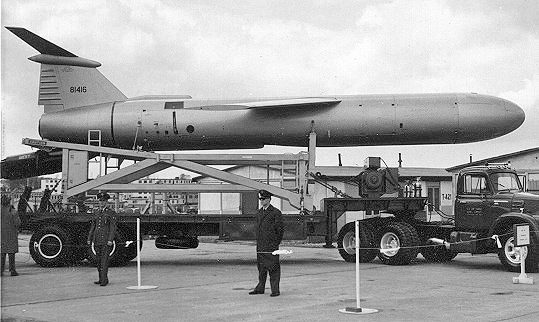
TM-76 Mace of the 38th Tactical Missile Wing

In 1962, the squadron began to replace its Matadors with an improved version of the missile, the Martin TM-76 Mace. In September of that year, the 38th Wing reorganized. The 586th Group was absorbed into the squadron and its maintenance squadron became a detachment of the 38th Missile Maintenance Squadron at Sembach Air Base. The 89th Tactical Missile Squadron was activated, as separate missile squadrons were formed for each dispersed site. The squadron was assigned directly to the 38th Wing once more. In September 1966, MGM-13A Mace operations in Europe ceased and only the 71st Tactical Missile Squadron, which operated the CGM-13B model of the Mace, which could be launched from its protective shelter and incorporated inertial guidance, remained. The squadron was inactivated along with the 38th Wing and its missiles were shipped to Eglin Air Force Base, Florida to be used as targets.

During this era, the squadron's dispersed firing locations included Site IV "Veronica" 7.0 miles (11.3 km) ENE of Hahn Air Base 49°59′58″N 007°23′58″E; (Note: The site was transferred to the 89th Tactical Missile Squadron in September 1962.) Site V "Pot Fuse" 7.0 miles (11.3 km) ESE of Hahn Air Base 49°54′48″N 007°24′46″E (Note: The site has been abandoned since 1961. The shelters were torn down, and the site is very obscured by trees and other vegetation in thick woodland area.) and Site VI "Heroin" 9.7 miles (15.6 km) NE of Hahn Air Base 50°02′37″N 007°25′32″E (Note: After the 405th left, this site was transferred to the United States Army and converted into a Nike Hercules air defense missile site, and was operational from 1970 to 1979. The area was transferred back to the Air Force in 1982 and was converted again, this time into a cruise missile ground alert maintenance area. The 38th Tactical Missile Wing became operational with BGM-109 Gryphon cruise missiles at this location in 1985 and it was closed in 1991 after the signing of the INF treaty.)

===== Gryphon =====
The squadron was activated again at Woensdrecht Air Base, Netherlands on 17 August 1987 as the final BGM-109G Ground Launched Cruise Missile unit and assigned to the 486th Tactical Missile Wing. (Note: The 486th Wing was formed by consolidating the 586th Tactical Missile Group with the World War II 486th Bombardment Group. Endicott, Lineage and Honors History.) However, the Intermediate-Range Nuclear Forces Treaty was entered into between the United States and the Soviet Union before the squadron had received any of its missiles, and it was the first to inactivate in implementing the treaty, on 30 September 1988.

== Lineage ==
- Constituted as the 15th Reconnaissance Squadron (Medium) on 20 November 1940

Activated on 15 January 1941
Redesignated 405th Bombardment Squadron (Medium) on 22 April 1942
Redesignated 405th Bombardment Squadron, Medium c. 19 September 1944
Redesignated 405th Bombardment Squadron, Light on 6 May 1946
Inactivated on 1 April 1949

- Activated on 1 January 1953

Redesignated 405th Bombardment Squadron, Tactical on 1 October 1955
Redesignated 405th Tactical Missile Squadron on 18 June 1958
Inactivated 25 September 1966

- Activated on 17 August 1987

Inactivated on 30 September 1988

=== Assignments ===
- Unknown (probably Northeast Air District (later 1st Air Force)), 15 January 1941 (attached to 38th Bombardment Group)
- Unknown (probably 3rd Air Force), c. 5 June 1941 (attached to 38th Bombardment Group)
- Unknown (probably III Bomber Command), 5 September 1941 (attached to 38th Bombardment Group)
- 38th Bombardment Group, 25 February 1942 – 1 April 1949
- 38th Bombardment Group, 1 January 1953
- 38th Bombardment Wing, 8 December 1957
- 586th Tactical Missile Group, 18 June 1958
- 38th Tactical Missile Wing, 25 September 1962 – 25 September 1966
- 486th Tactical Missile Wing, 17 August 1987 – 30 September 1988

=== Stations ===
- Langley Field, Virginia, 15 January 1941
- Jackson Army Air Base, Mississippi, c. 5 June 1941 – 19 January 1942
- Doomben Field, Queensland, Australia, 25 February 1942
- Ballarat Airport, Victoria, Australia, 8 March 1942
- Breddan Aerodrome, Queensland, Australia, 7 August 1942
- RAAF Base Townsville, Queensland, Australia, c. 30 September 1942
- Durand Airfield, Port Moresby, New Guinea, c. 25 October 1942
- Nadzab Airfield Complex, New Guinea, 6 March 1944
- Mokmer Airfield, Biak, Netherlands East Indies, c. 5 September 1944
- Pitoe Airfield, Morotai, Netherlands East Indies, c. 15 October 1944
- Lingayen Airfield, Luzon, Philippines, 30 January 1945
- Motobu Airfield, Okinawa, 21 July 1945
- Itazuke Airfield, Japan, c. 21 November 1945
- Itami Airfield, Japan, 26 October 1946
- Itazuke Air Base, Japan, 14 January 1947
- Itami Airfield, Japan, 1 September 1947 – 1 April 1949
- Laon-Couvron Air Base, France, 1 January 1953
- Hahn Air Base, Germany, 18 June 1958 – 25 September 1966
- Woensdrecht Air Base, Netherlands, 17 August 1987 – 30 September 1988

=== Aircraft and missiles ===
- Douglas B-18 Bolo, 1941
- Stearman PT-13 Kaydet, 1941
- Martin B-26 Marauder, 1941–1942
- North American B-25 Mitchell, 1942–1946, 1947–1948
- Douglas A-26 (later B-26) Invader, 1946, 1947–1949, 1953–1955
- Martin B-57 Canberra, 1955–1958
- Martin TM-61 (later MGM-1) Matador, 1958–1962
- Martin TM-76 (later MGM-13) Mace, 1962–1966

=== Awards and campaigns ===
Award streamer	Award	Dates	Notes
	Distinguished Unit Citation	17 September 1942–23 January 1943	Papua New Guinea 405th Bombardment Squadron
	Distinguished Unit Citation	24–26 December 1943	New Britain 405th Bombardment Squadron
	Distinguished Unit Citation	16-17 June 1944	New Guinea 405th Bombardment Squadron
	Distinguished Unit Citation	10 November 1944	Leyte 405th Bombardment Squadron
	Air Force Outstanding Unit Award	1 April 1956–1 March 1958	405th Bombardment Squadron
	Air Force Outstanding Unit Award	1 April 1959–30 January 1961	405th Tactical Missile Squadron
	Air Force Outstanding Unit Award	1 June 1964–1 June 1966	405th Tactical Missile Squadron
	Philippine Republic Presidential Unit Citation	30 January 1945–4 July 1945	405th Bombardment Squadron

Campaign Streamer	Campaign	Dates	Notes
	Air Offensive, Japan	17 April 1942 – 2 September 1945	405th Bombardment Squadron
	China Defensive	4 July 1942 – 4 May 1945	405th Bombardment Squadron
	Papua	23 July 1942 – 23 January 1943	405th Bombardment Squadron
	New Guinea	24 January 1943 – 31 December 1944	405th Bombardment Squadron
	Northern Solomons	23 February 1943 – 21 November 1944	405th Bombardment Squadron
	Bismarck Archipelago	15 December 1943 – 27 November 1944	405th Bombardment Squadron
	Leyte	17 October 1944 – 1 July 1945	405th Bombardment Squadron
	Luzon	15 December 1944 – 4 July 1945	405th Bombardment Squadron
	Southern Philippines	27 February 1945 – 4 July 1945	405th Bombardment Squadron
	Western Pacific	17 April 1945 – 2 September 1945	405th Bombardment Squadron

== See also ==
- United States Army Air Forces in Australia
- List of United States Air Force missile squadrons
- Cheli Air Force Station
- List of B-57 units of the United States Air Force
- List of A-26 Invader operators
- List of Martin B-26 Marauder operators
