= 38th Bombardment Group =

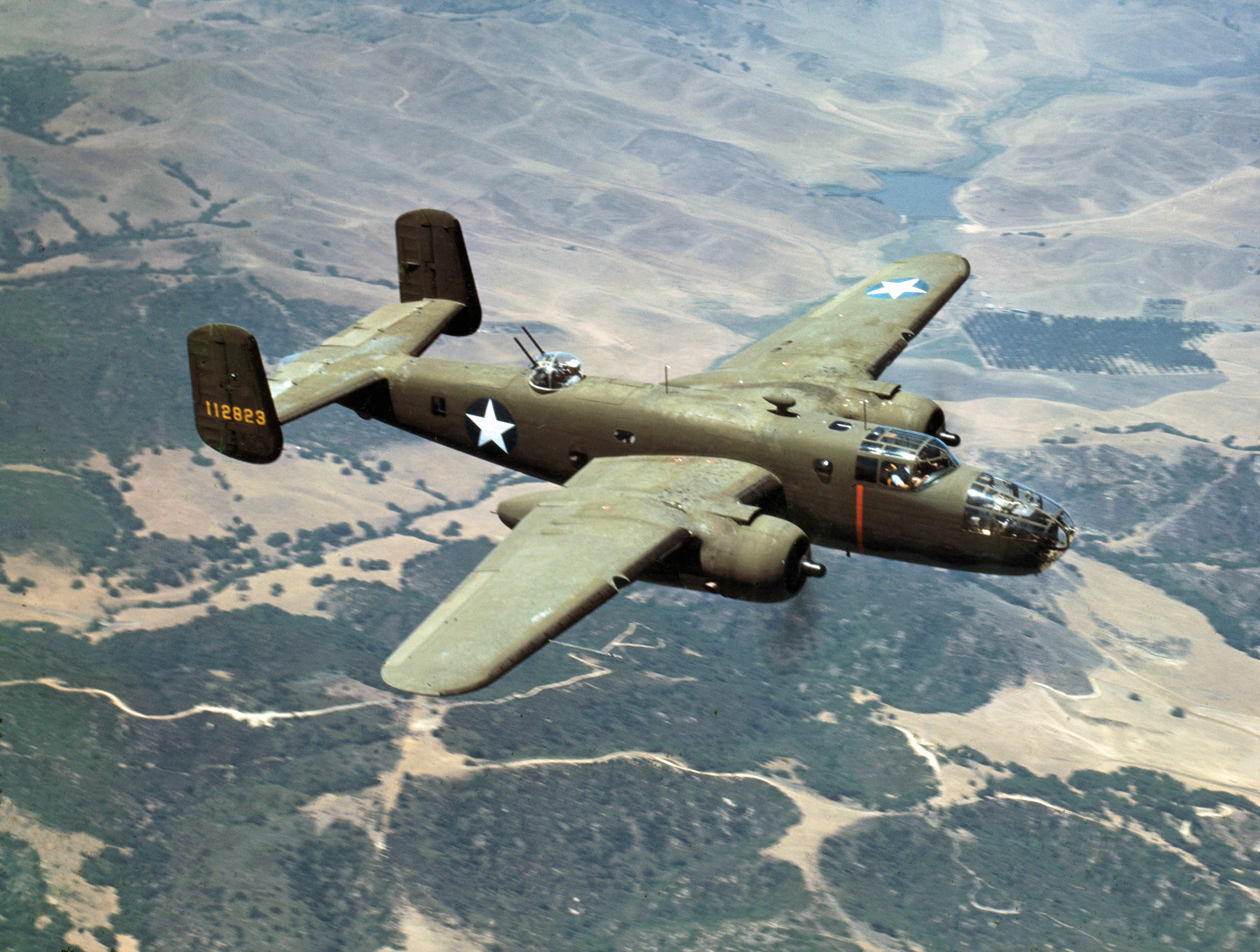
- North American B-25C Mitchell medium bomber
- Active: 1941–1949; 1953–1957
- Country: United States
- Branch: United States Air Force
- Type: medium bombardment
- Size: 1942: 36 aircraft, 800 personnel; 1943: 72 aircraft, 1600 personnel; 1945: 96 aircraft, 1800 personnel
- Nickname: The Sun Setters
- Engagements: Battle of Midway; Battle of the Bismarck Sea; Bombing of Wewak; Bombing of Rabaul (November 1943); Battle of Ormoc Bay
- Decorations

Insignia
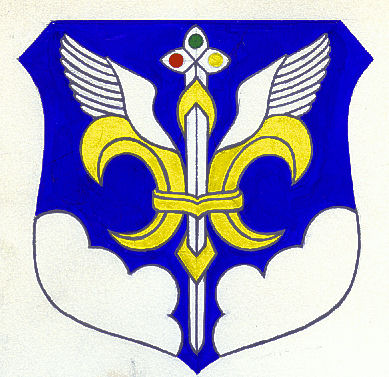
- Emblem of the 38th Bombardment Group

Aircraft flown
- Bomber: B-25 Mitchell; B-26 Marauder; A-26/B-26 Invader; B-57 Canberra

The 38th Bombardment Group is an inactive unit of the United States Air Force. It was most recently assigned as the operational (flying) component of the 38th Bombardment Wing, stationed at Laon-Couvron Air Base, France, where it was inactivated on 8 December 1957.

During World War II the 38th Bomb Group was a medium bombardment group operating in the Southwest Pacific Area (SWPA) as a B-25 Mitchell unit assigned to Fifth Air Force. It was one of the first combat organizations of the United States Army Air Forces to be deployed to the Pacific Theater when elements took part in the June 1942, Battle of Midway using the Martin B-26 Marauder medium bomber. Operating in separated echelons until February 1943, the group was re-organized in April 1943 into a standardized B-25 unit. At the conclusion of World War II, the group converted to the A-26 (later B-26) Invader medium bomber.

The 38th Bomb Group was awarded four Distinguished Unit Citations for its combat service in Papua (Buna and Gona, 23 July 1942 to 23 January 1943); New Britain (Cape Gloucester, 24–26 December 43); New Guinea (Jefman-Samate-Sorong, 16–17 June 1944); and Leyte (Ormoc Bay, 10 November 1944). It also received recognition from the government of the Philippines with an award of the Philippine Presidential Unit Citation.

During the early years of the Cold War, the unit operated in France as a NATO tactical bombardment group flying Martin B-57B Canberras. The group formed the "Black Knights" aerial demonstration team that performed at several air shows in Western Europe, including the 1957 Paris Air Show. The Black Knights were the only tactical bomber show team in the world.

== History ==
For additional history and lineage, see 38th Combat Support Wing

=== Lineage ===
- Constituted as 38th Bombardment Group (Medium) on 20 November 1940

Activated on 15 January 1941
Redesignated 38th Bombardment Group, Light on 6 May 1946
Inactivated in the Far East on 1 April 1949.

- Activated in France on 1 January 1953

Redesignated 38th Bombardment Group, Tactical on 1 October 1955
Inactivated on 8 December 1957

- Redesignated 38th Tactical Missile Group on 31 July 1985 (remained inactive)

=== Assignments ===
- 3 Bomber (later, III Bomber) Command, 15 January 1941 – 18 January 1942
- V Bomber Command

Air Echelon remained attached to III Bomber Command, 18 January-1 May 1942
Ground Echelon assigned to United States Army Forces in Australia, 18 January-25 February 1942
Ground Echelon assigned to Allied Air Forces, Southwest Pacific Area, 1 April 1942
Two squadrons attached to VII Fighter Command, 1 May-1 August 1942

- V Fighter Command (Combined unit), 1 August 1942
- Fifth Air Force 22 November 1945
- 38th Bombardment Wing 18 August 1948 – 1 April 1949; 1 January 1953 – 8 December 1957

=== Components ===
- 69th Bombardment Squadron: 15 January 1941 – 26 February 1943
- 70th Bombardment Squadron: 15 January 1941 – 26 February 1943
- 71st Bombardment Squadron: 15 January 1941 – 1 April 1949; 1 January 1953 – 8 December 1957
- 89th Bombardment Squadron: 6 May 1946 – 1 April 1949
- 15th Reconnaissance (later 405th Bombardment) Squadron: 25 February 1942 – 1 April 1949; 1 January 1953 – 8 December 1957
- 822d Bombardment Squadron: 20 April 1943 – 12 April 1946; 1 January 1953 – 8 December 1957
- 823d Bombardment Squadron: 20 April 1943 – 12 April 1946

=== Stations ===
- Langley Field, Virginia, 15 January 1941*
- Jackson AAB, Mississippi, c. 5 June 1941 – 18 January 1942

Two squadrons operated from Hickam Field, Hawaii Territory until mid June 1942, then from Plaine Des Gaiacs Airfield, New Caledonia, and Nandi Airfield, Fiji

- Doomben Field (Eagle Farm Airport), Australia, 25 February 1942*
- Ballarat Airport, Australia, 8 March 1942*
- RAAF Base Amberley, Australia, 30 April 1942*
- Doomben Field (Eagle Farm Airport), Australia, c. 10 June 1942*
- Breddan Airfield, Australia, 7 August 1942
- RAAF Base Townsville, Australia, 30 September 1942

*Group ground echelons only, no aircraft or crews

- Durand Airfield, Port Moresby, New Guinea, 26 November 1942
- Nadzab Airfield Complex, New Guinea, 4 March 1944
- Borokoe Airfield, Biak, Netherlands East Indies, 1 October 1944
- Pitoe Airfield, Morotai, Netherlands East Indies, 15 October 1944
- Lingayen Airfield, Luzon, Philippines Commonwealth, 30 January 1945
- Yontan Airfield, Okinawa, 25 July 1945
- Itazuke Airfield, Japan, 27 November 1945
- Itami Airfield, Japan, 26 October 1946 – 1 April 1949
- Laon-Couvron Air Base, France 1 January 1953 – 8 December 1957

=== Aircraft ===
- Douglas B-18 Bolo (1941)
- Martin B-26 Marauder (1941–1942)
- North American B-25 Mitchell (1942–1945, 1947–1949)
- Douglas B-26 Invader (1945–1949, 1953–1955)
- Martin B-57 Canberra (1955–1957)

== Operations ==
=== World War II ===
==== Creation, training, and overseas movement ====
The 38th Bombardment Group (Medium) was constituted on 20 November 1940 by War Department General Order AG 320.2, and activated on 15 January 1941 at Langley Army Air Base, Virginia, by the 2nd Wing, GHQ Air Force. Its original cadre consisted of seven officers and 112 enlisted men transferred from the 22d Bombardment Group to administratively organize the group. Its original assigned flying squadrons were the 69th, 70th and 71st Bomb Squadrons, with the 15th Reconnaissance Squadron activated at the same time and attached.

In the first week of June 1941, the group transferred to Jackson Army Air Base, Mississippi to receive an influx of personnel just graduated from technical schools and to train a large levy of drafted enlisted men, mostly from Pennsylvania, fresh out of basic training. The first combat crews joined the group on 2 September, consisting of 30 newly commissioned pilots of Randolph Field Pilot Training Class 41-F, who began group training in seven B-18s and two PT-13 Kaydets. The next month the group began receiving new Martin B-26 Marauders, and by 1 December 1941 each bomb squadron had 13 assigned. The first loss of an aircraft was 69th BS B-26 40-1472 in a landing accident at Jackson AAB, with all six crewmen killed, on 21 December 1941.

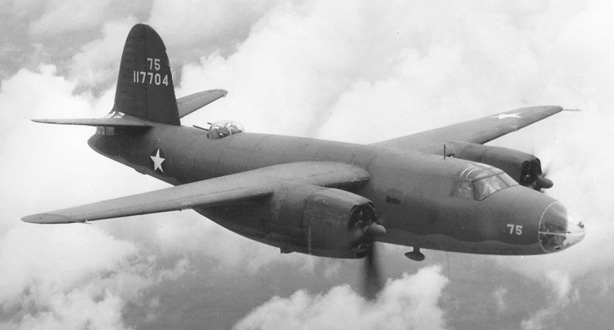
Martin B-26 Marauder

The German U-boat threat to Allied shipping earmarked the group for assignment to anti-submarine warfare patrols from a base in South America. Orders to transfer the group to Savannah AAB, Georgia, as the first step in the process, were rescinded when the United States was drawn into the war on 7 December 1941. Instead the group remained at Jackson until 18 January when its ground echelon entrained for movement to a port of embarkation at San Francisco, California, where it was quartered in the Cow Palace.

On 29 January the ground echelon boarded the Army transport USAT Tasker H. Bliss, formerly the Dollar Liner SS President Cleveland. The Bliss left in convoy from San Francisco on the 31st and arrived at Brisbane, Australia on 25 February 1942. On that date the 15th Reconnaissance Squadron was assigned as the group's fourth squadron, and re-designated the 405th Bomb Squadron on 22 April 1942.

The ground personnel of the group were employed as service and construction troops, working at various bases until assignment to Charters Towers on 2 August. The advance party, however, found that the 3rd Bomb Group and its A-20 Havocs occupied all the desirable space and established a camp at Breddan on 7 August. The ground element of the 71st BS moved to Batchelor Field, Darwin, on 1 May to act as a service squadron for the 19th Bomb Group, which had been compelled to evacuate its B-17s from the Philippines by Japanese advances. On 12 August it rejoined the group at Breddan.

The air echelon did not accompany the sea movement and was quartered at Fort McDowell, California, until 6 April, when it moved by train to Patterson Field, Ohio, to continue B-26 training. On 8–7 May, the 69th and 70th BS flew new B-26Bs to California for movement to Hawaii, while the 71st and 405th began receiving B-25 Mitchell bombers for training. The 71st moved to MacDill AAB where it exchanged its experienced B-26 crews for those of the 21st Bomb Group (a unit converting to B-26s), which were entirely newly graduated pilots from Shafter Field Pilot Training Class 42-E. The 405th flew to Barksdale Field, Louisiana, to exchange crews with the 17th Bomb Group, which was converting to B-26s because a large portion of its B-25s had been lost on the Doolittle Raid. These novice pilots and crews became the core of the group's combat crews for the next 15 months. (Note: At least one anecdotal narrative by a 38th combat veteran recalled that, in addition to the inter-group crew swaps described in the 38th's official history, the B-26 crews of the 69th/70th were "swapped" internally with the B-26 crews of the 71st/405th just prior to the 7 May detachment of those squadrons from the group. The designated commander of the 38th's air echelon, 405th BS commander Lt. Col. Millard Lewis, was detached at Barksdale to command the 335th Bombardment Group, a new B-26 training group.)

==== 69th and 70th Bomb Squadrons ====
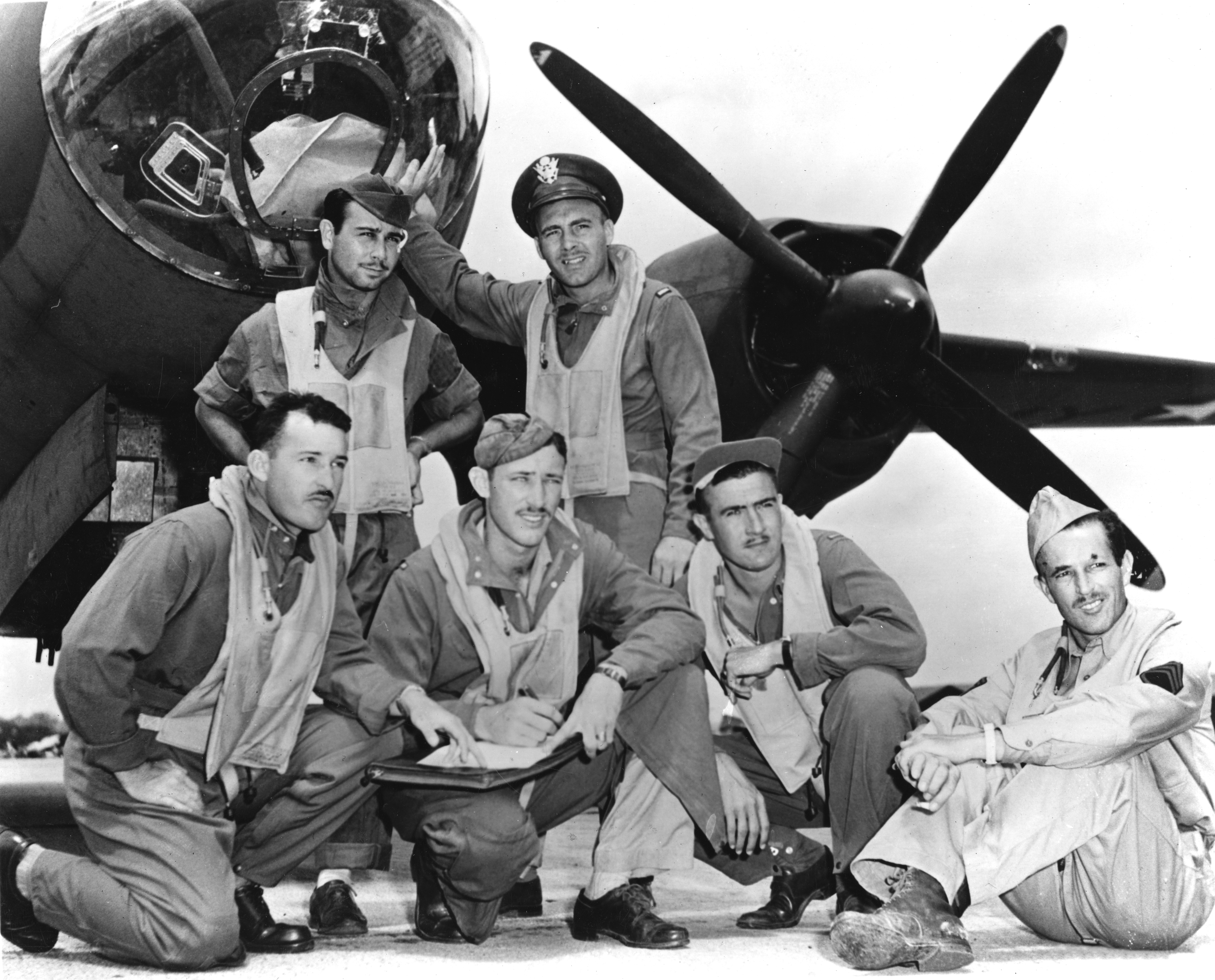
B-26 crew at Midway Island

On 19 May the first flight of three B-26 Marauders left Hamilton Field, for Hawaii. From 22 May to 10 June the 69th and 70th Bomb Squadrons ferried 26 Marauders to Hickam Field without a single mishap.

Two aircraft of the 69th BS in Hawaii took part in the Battle of Midway as part of Seventh Air Force. Together with two Marauders from the 18th Reconnaissance Squadron of the 22nd Bomb Group, they were modified to each carry a Mark 13 torpedo and practised torpedo runs for ten days before being deployed to Midway Island. All four took off on the morning of 4 June 1942, in an attempt to attack Japanese aircraft carriers. The bombers began their long torpedo runs at 800 feet altitude, and two were lost before they could release. The remaining B-26s then dropped down to only ten feet above the water under heavy attack from Japanese fighters and antiaircraft fire. Neither hit the carriers. The two Marauders shot down included one with a 69th BS crew, while the two survivors were heavily damaged. (Note: Capt. James F. Collins, Jr. of the 69th BS led the attack. 2nd Lt. William S. Watson and his entire crew were shot down and killed on their way into the target at low level. The 28 members of all four crews were awarded the Distinguished Service Cross.)

On 13 June the 69th received orders to proceed to New Caledonia. Equipped with only ten B-26s and based at Plaine Des Gaiacs Airfield, New Caledonia, it became the first medium bombardment squadron in the South Pacific Area. The 70th Bombardment Squadron arrived at Nandi Airfield on Fiji one week later.

Both squadrons conducted search and bombing missions in the Solomon Islands from McDonald Field on Efate during the Guadalcanal campaign, and the 69th staged twice with torpedoes for strikes against the Japanese fleet that never materialized. The 70th was briefly based on Guadalcanal in mid-November. The 69th arrived at Guadalcanal on 31 December and immediately bombed the Japanese airfield under construction at Munda. It remained at Henderson Field until 12 January, flying eleven missions against Munda and the Japanese seaplane base at Rekata Bay, where it lost two Marauders to antiaircraft fire on 7 January 1943.

The 69th was advised at the end of September that it would be converting to B-25s, but it was November before the first five were received. It turned over its surviving B-26s to the 70th BS in March 1943 when it received 10 new Mitchells and began three months of conversion training. On 26 February 1943, the 69th and 70th squadrons were reassigned from the 38th Bomb Group. In March they were assigned to the 42nd Bombardment Group based on Fiji and the 70th also began conversion to B-25s.

==== 71st and 405th Bomb Squadrons ====
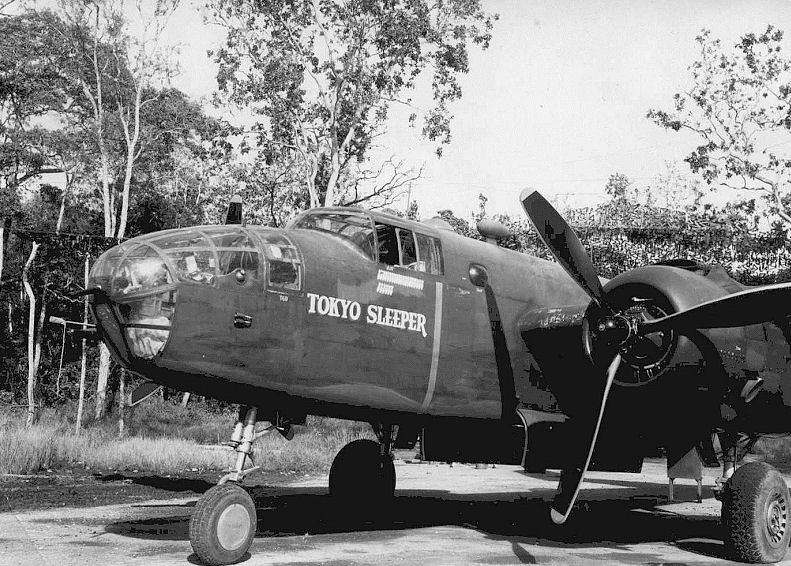
Tokyo Sleeper, an original 405th BS B-25C, at Durand Airfield

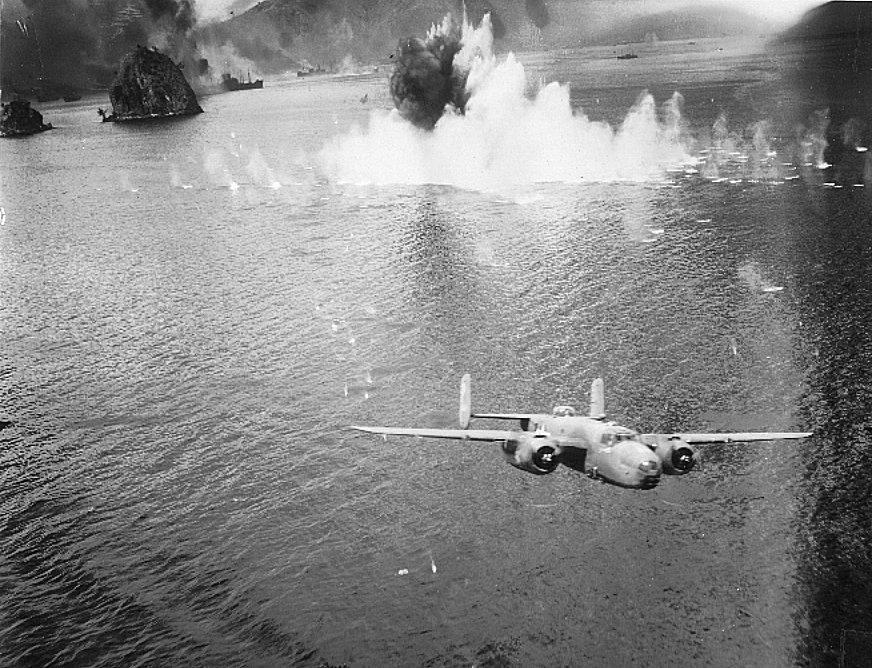
B-25 engaged in "mast head" bombing in New Guinea.

The two B-25 squadrons of the 38th BG picked up 37 new B-25C and B-25D aircraft (Note: The types were identical. The designations denote their place of manufacture: Inglewood, California (C) and Kansas City, Kansas (D).) at McClellan Field, California, on 28 July 1942, flew them to Hamilton Field, and began movement to Hawaii in early August. These were the first B-25s to be flown to their overseas bases. (Note: Between 20 and 40 B-25Cs had been in combat with the 3rd Bomb Group since 6 April, but were from a consignment shipped in crates to Australia for use by the Dutch Air Force. These had been returned to (or retained by) the USAAF because the Dutch did not have pilots to fly them.) Stripped of all armament (shipped separately by sea) to reduce weight and navigated without radio beacon aids, they continued on from Hickam Field to Breddan via Christmas Island, Canton Island, Fiji, and New Caledonia. During the ferry operation, a navigation error over New South Wales while trying to find Amberley, Queensland caused five bombers of the 405th BS to become lost on 14 August and run out of fuel. One was abandoned near Lismore, one crash-landed at Casino, and two others crash-landed at Grafton. The fifth managed to land safely at Evans Head. One crewman was killed bailing out of his aircraft. (Note: The navigator's parachute opened inside the aircraft and was useless. He attempted to parachute by hanging onto another crewman, but was torn away by the shock of the chute opening.)

All aircraft of 71st BS arrived in Australia by 14 August and those of the 405th by 21 August. The now 33 bombers of the group were in place at Breddan by 25 August, and the two squadrons began flying training missions from Charters Towers on 29 August. (Note: The standard medium bombardment group had four squadrons and 63 aircraft in 1942–43.) The group was assigned to the newly activated V Bomber Command, Fifth Air Force and operated in that command to October 1944, attacking Japanese airfields, shipping, and ground forces in New Guinea and the Bismarck Archipelago. (Note: Of the original 37 bombers, five were transferred to other units. Seven were lost in combat, fourteen to non-combat accidents, and seven retired from combat by 1 March 1944, to become administrative aircraft ("hacks"). Only four continued flying combat after that date, the last retired in September 1944 with 160+ missions.)

On 9–10 September, in preparation for starting operations, the 38th BG was assigned to the Fifth Air Force's Advanced Echelon (ADVON) and a forward echelon moved to Horn Island Aerodrome. 12 Mitchells flew the first combat mission on 15 September 1942, staging through Port Moresby, to bomb and strafe Japanese Army positions and an airfield near Buna, New Guinea. On 28 September the forward echelon displaced to Laloki airfield, New Guinea, where it continued reconnaissance and occasional bombing missions, while the remainder of the group moved up to Townsville. The 38th BG experienced its first combat loss when fighters shot down a B-25 attacking a convoy off Buna on 5 October.

The group had been without a commanding officer for nearly six months, (Note: When the air echelon was broken up in May 1942, group commander Lt. Col. Fay Upthegrove (in Australia) returned to the United States and was assigned command of the 99th Bombardment Group. The 38th BG was under the acting command of its executive officer, Lt. Col. Theodore C. Castle, until Col. Brian O'Neill took command. The history compiled by the 38th BG Association in 2005 stated that Castle had been in actual command but was relieved for medical reasons related to a near-air crash. If so, Air Force records do not bear this out.) and on 6 November Lt. Col. Brian O'Neill, commander of the 22nd BG's 408th Bomb Squadron at Reid River Airfield in Australia, transferred to the 38th BG and took command of the group. O'Neill remained in command for the next year, until a freak ground accident caused him to be transferred for medical treatment in October 1943. (Note: Per the group history, O'Neill, known as "Shanty" O'Neill, had a late night fondness for powdered cheese, which he would scoop from a container kept in the headquarters squadron mess. New cooks, unaware of his habit and without changing the storage location, used the container to store lye, which O'Neill nearly ingested and which caused severe chemical burns to his mouth. When infection set it, he was sent to Australia for hospitalization. O'Neill returned to Fifth Air Force as a staff officer with the 308th Bomb Wing, the next higher administrative echelon for the 38th BG.)

During the month of November 1942, the group staged through Rorona airstrip, flying a limited number of missions while the ground echelon completed its move to New Guinea by sea. (Note: The 38BG Association published an anecdote in its newsletter, possibly apocryphal, that the scheduled move was advanced before their base was completed because of a tiff in the Officer's Club in Townsville between crewmen of the 405th BS and the base Provost Marshal. The crewmen, returning from a mission to retrieve their personal items, found their quarters reassigned to another unit and their belongings missing. When they attempted to dine at the club, they were threatened with arrest by the Provost for failing to wear ties, and to instigate a protest arrest, destroyed glassware, aware that the commanding general of ADVON, BG Ennis C. Whitehead, would have them released. A variation in the association's group history (2005) has them arriving after the club had closed, being refused dinner because they were not in Class A uniform, and then arrested for throwing food on the floor.) On 26 November it moved into another of Moresby's airfield complex, Durand Airfield ("17 Mile Drome"), from which it would operate for fifteen months. At Durand, as at the five bases which followed, the group lived in dispersed tent cities, was subject to nightly raids on its facilities by Japanese aircraft, and often staged through crude forward strips to extend the range of its combat operations.

The group participated in the Battle of the Bismarck Sea on 3 March 1943, with the 405th BS engaging in an early example of "mast head" (skip) bombing. (Note: O'Neill flew the morning mission in the lead aircraft of the 405th with Ralph Cheli, and the afternoon mission in the lead aircraft of the 71st BS, earning the Distinguished Service Cross.) Following the Bismarck Sea mission, the 38th returned all of its aircraft over a period of months to the 4th Air Depot in Townsville for field modification to the B-25C-1 (405th BS) and B-25D-1 (71st BS) strafer configuration in which the nose compartment was enclosed with sheet metal with eight forward-firing machine guns mounted in the nose and in blister packs on the fuselage side below the cockpit. The lower turret was also removed and replaced by a 150-gallon fuel tank mounted on bomb racks that allowed it to be jettisoned once fuel was transferred. The 405th made low level strafing attacks its standard operating procedure in March 1943, while the 71st BS commenced such missions in May. The modification process and training needs released the group from most combat operations between April and July.

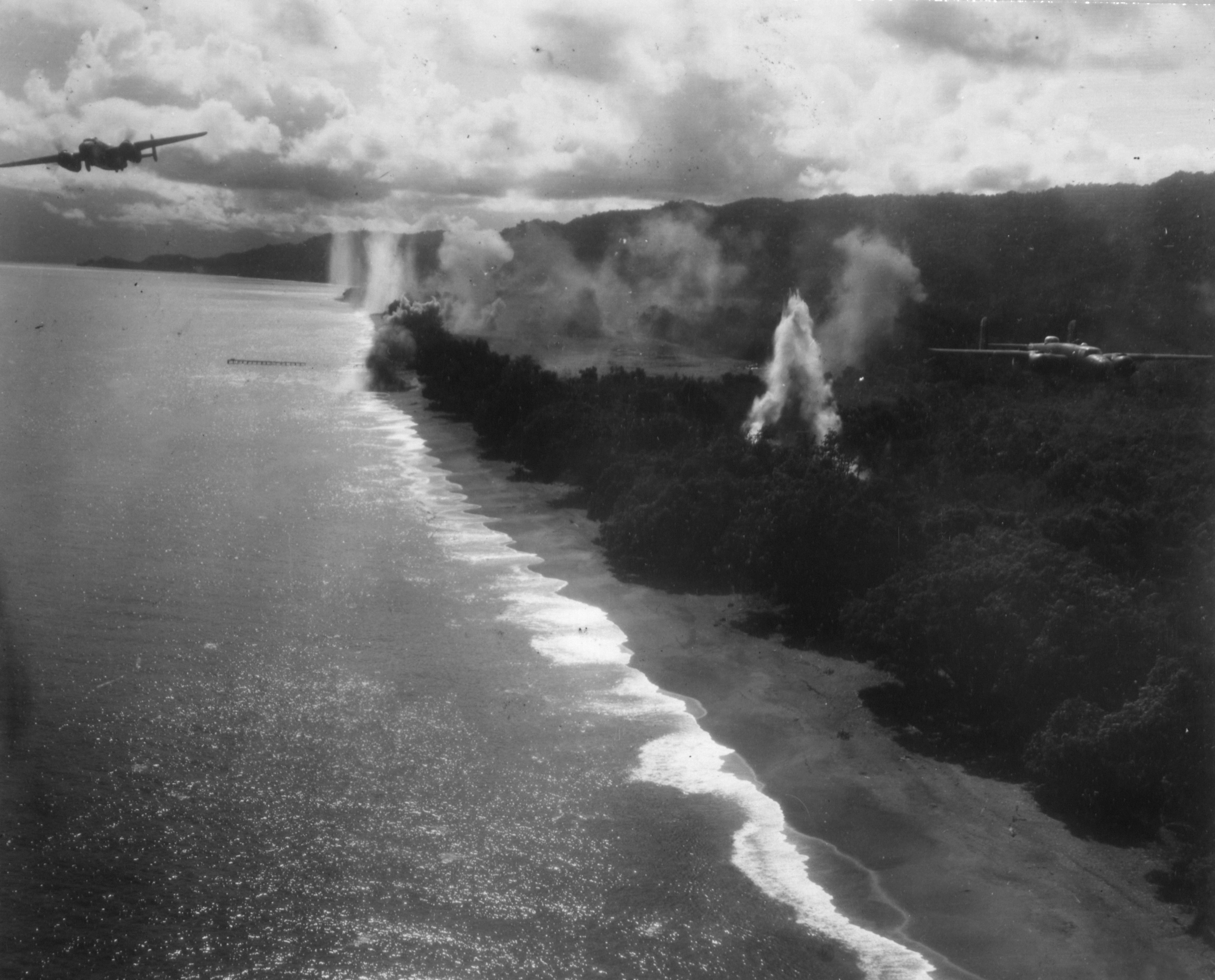
B-25s attacking Dagua Airdrome, New Guinea, in 1943.

Major Ralph Cheli (pronounced "Kelly" /ˈkɛli/) was awarded the Medal of Honor for a mission on the second day of the bombing of Wewak on 18 August 1943. Assigned to lead both the group and the 405th BS in an attack on heavily defended Dagua Airdrome, his C-1 strafer was severely hit by enemy fire while at 150 feet. Cheli remained in formation and led the attack before crash-landing his bomber into the sea. Initially he was believed killed in the crash, but post war evidence indicates that he survived the crash but was executed in March 1944 by the Japanese while a POW on Rabaul. What were believed to be the remains of Cheli and other similarly executed POWs are now interred at Jefferson Barracks National Cemetery in St. Louis, Missouri. (Note: Of the three crews shot down in August 1943, all but one of the twelve survivors captured are believed to have been executed by their captors.)

Two weeks later, on 2 September, sixteen strafers attacked shipping reported in Wewak harbor. Attacking in eight two-plane elements with two 1000-pound bombs each, the Mitchells came in just over the crests of low ridges to the south, into a barrage of intense antiaircraft fire at their altitude. 10 to 15 Japanese fighters eluded the P-38 top cover by circling under a 5000-foot ceiling, then attacked the bomber formation vertically and from the rear for 25 minutes. One bomber of the 405th BS was shot up as it released its bombs, then ditched in the bay. A second was pursued after bombing and cartwheeled into the Bismarck Sea when hit by fighter attacks. A third was shot down during the attacks of the 71st BS when it "snap rolled" at wavetop height and crashed inverted into the bay. The crews of all three aircraft were killed. Despite the losses, small barrage balloons anchored to each ship, and a number of overshoots of the bombs, the attack succeeded in hitting several of the vessels.

==== 822d and 823d Bomb Squadrons ====
The 822d and 823d Bomb Squadrons were constituted and assigned to the 38th BG on 20 April 1943 to bring the group to a full strength of four squadrons. Both squadrons were raised in New Guinea using a cadre from the 38th BG to provide group training to a pool of incoming ground personnel, and later to new pilots. The ground personnel landed at Port Moresby on 23 June 1943 after a month at sea, while the air crews trained at Charters Towers until October. 38 new B-25G aircraft began field modifications at Townsville on 24 September and were flown by their crews to Durand on 9 and 10 October. The new squadrons flew their first combat mission on 15 October 1943.

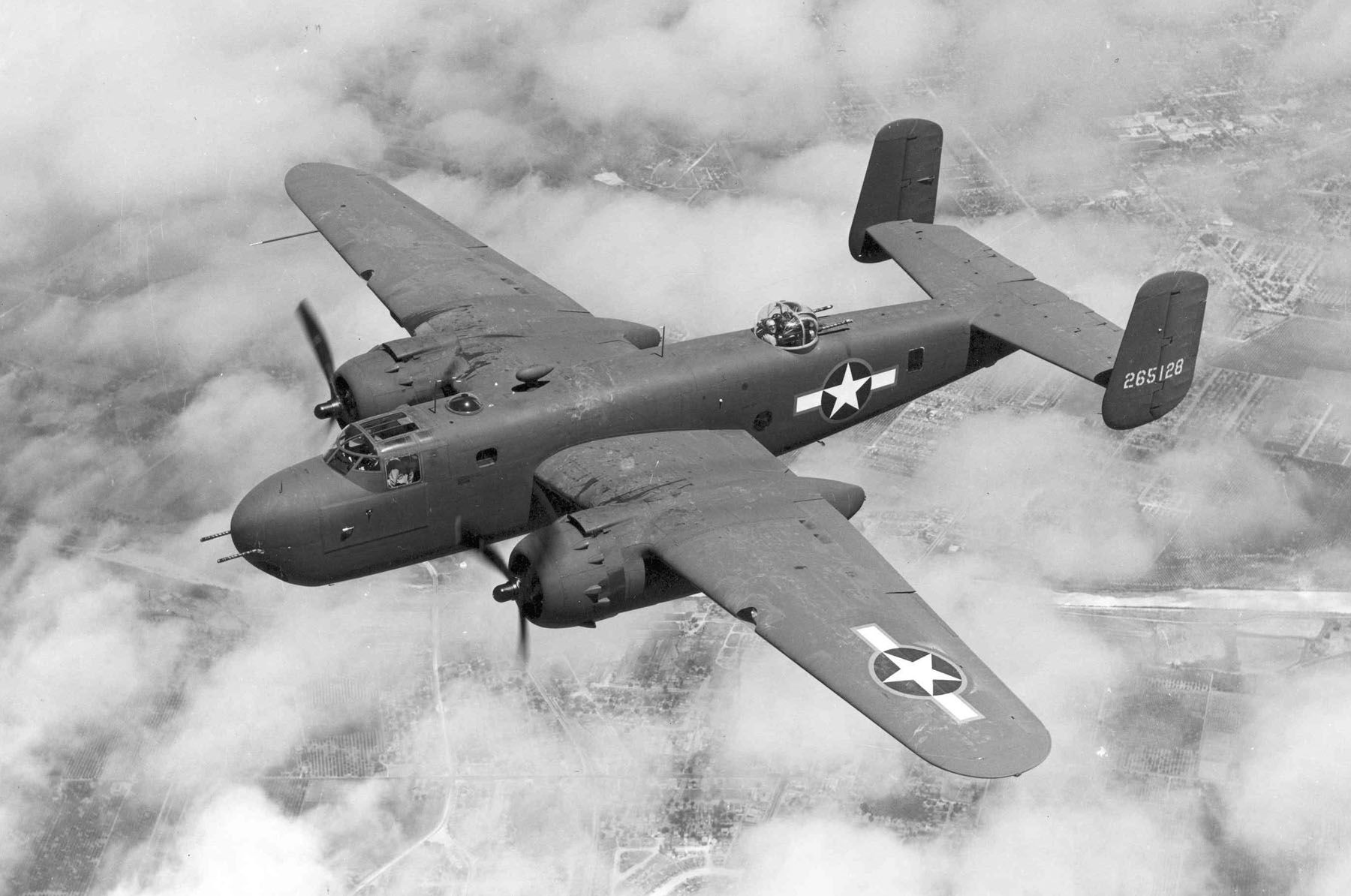
B-25G. The 75mm cannon is mounted on the underside of the nose area on the pilot's side.

The 822d and 823d BS field-tested the cannon-mounted B-25G bombers, and from 19 November to 25 December they were employed over the northwest coastal areas of New Britain against barge traffic between New Guinea and New Britain. The B-25G underwent a thorough combat testing during the period, firing 1,253 rounds of 75 mm ammunition. Five were lost in the first month of combat and a dozen by May 1944. The losses were initially replaced by five B-25Hs, but Fifth Air Force did not prefer this model, and soon after losses were replaced by strafer configured B-25Ds. In early February 1944 the G models began depot conversion to the "B-25G-1" configuration, replacing the cannon with two .50 caliber machine guns. The surviving G-1 models were transferred in September 1944 to the 41st Bomb Group after new B-25Js were received.

The two veteran squadrons engaged in a series of large strikes mounted by Fifth Air Force against Rabaul in the latter half of October, attempting to neutralize the Japanese base before Allied landings on Bougainville, scheduled for 1 November. On 2 November, the 71st and 405th BS were part of a force of nine understrength squadrons of B-25s and six squadrons of P-38 Lightning fighters that attacked Simpson Harbor to cover the landings. In its strafing attack on shipping, the 38th lost three B-25s to antiaircraft fire from numerous Japanese naval vessels in the harbor. (Note: The Fifth Air Force lost nine B-25s, three from each of the attacking groups, and nine P-38s at Rabaul on "Bloody Tuesday".)

After the neutralization of Rabaul, the group attacked airfields on New Britain in preparation for the landing of the U.S. Marines on Cape Gloucester, then shifted on 19 December to bombing of defense positions. On D-Day, 26 December, all four squadrons of the group laid smoke screens and strafed the beaches at low altitude, for which the group was awarded its second Distinguished Unit Citation. In January 1944 the group began staging its missions through Dobodura. On 15 February 1944 the group attacked Japanese shipping in Kavieng harbor, where a 71st BS B-25 was forced to ditch after being set aflame by antiaircraft fire during its bomb run. The three survivors of the crew were among fifteen rescued by U.S. Navy PBY Catalina pilot Lt. J.G. Nathan G. Gordon, who received the Medal of Honor for the exploit. On 4 March the 38th BG moved to a new permanent station at Nadzab Field.

==== Operations in 1944 ====
The group experienced significant non-combat losses of aircraft to New Guinea's volatile climate and rugged terrain. (Note: One of the first crews lost on a combat mission fell to this deadly combination and their bodies were not recovered until more than 60 years after the crash. The 405th BS crew of B-25C 41-12907, nicknamed The Happy Legend, crashed into a mountainside in heavy cloud during a mission on 5 December 1942. Although the wreckage was located within weeks, the site remained inaccessible until 2002, and because live bombs were still in the wreckage, the remains of two crewmen could not be recovered until 2006. On 17 November 2009, one of the crewmembers and the personal effects of the remainder were buried in separate coffins at Arlington National Cemetery. "World War II Bomber Crew Buried", Air Force Magazine, February 2010, Vol. 93 No. 2, p. 18.) On 16 April 1944, 24 bombers took off to bomb Hollandia, with two returning to base with engine problems. The remaining 22 bombed their targets without opposition by the Japanese, but on the return flight encountered a massive storm front. Unable to penetrate the front, the squadron formations dispersed at the coast, with eight planes landing safely at Cape Gloucester and three others at Finschhafen. The other 11 attempted to land at Saidor, but two were severely damaged and four wrecked in crashes or runway collisions with other aircraft. Four airmen were killed. In all the weather front on "Black Sunday" claimed 37 USAAF aircraft lost or destroyed, the biggest weather loss in the history of the United States Air Force.

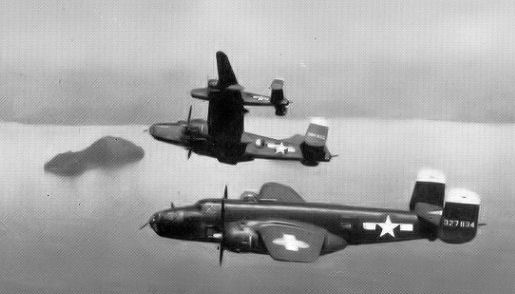
71st Bomb Squadron B-25Js in the Southwest Pacific, 1944.

While based at Nadzab, the group increasingly used forward strips from which to stage missions, including Hollandia, Wakde, and Borokoe Airfield on Biak. In May and June the 38 conducted a month of attacks against Japanese airpower in the Vogelkop to protect Allied amphibious movements along the north coast of New Guinea. The campaign culminated in a two-group attack on Jefman and Samate Dromes at the extreme western tip of New Guinea, led by the 38th BG. The 670-mile mission, the longest to date by medium bombers in the SWPA, required staging through Hollandia and Wakde airfields and the use of 215-gallon fuel tanks mounted in the bomb bays. Attacking in two waves of 11 aircraft abreast, the group strafed and used parachute bombs against more than forty Japanese aircraft on the fields. The leading wave of bombers claimed five Japanese aircraft shot down attempting to take off, and four others that evaded the P-38 escort and attempted to bomb the group using white phosphorus aerial-bursting bombs. The smoke from fires caused by its attack grew so thick that the last crews through were forced to fly on instruments. One mission report stated: "Col. (Donald P.) Hall led the formation so low over the drome that plane number 233, piloted by Lieutenant Breneman, was forced to pull up to strafe the operations tower." The next day the group returned to attack shipping it had observed in Sorong harbor during the mission against the airdromes. The missions earned the group its third DUC.

By the end of June, attrition and extensive operations reduced the group to 67 crews, of which only 23 were medically available for combat. As a result, nearly 300 air crewmen diagnosed with combat fatigue were sent back to the United States for rest and recuperation. (Note: Until September 1944 the Fifth Air Force did not have a program for rotation of combat crewmen based on completion of tour. The SWPA had the lowest priority of replacement scheduling, receiving only enough to fill attrition losses, and Gen. Kenney required crews to serve a minimum of a year on operations regardless of numbers of sorties or hours flown. Only personnel diagnosed as combat fatigue cases were returned to the United States without having a replacement already in the unit, a requirement of Headquarters AAF for rotation from all theaters of war. The other B-25 group in the Fifth Air Force, the 345th Bomb Group, had similar personnel problems. In September 1944, V Bomber Command published a rotation policy using a point system based on hours flown and combat conditions encountered that for B-25 crewmen averaged 250 combat hours for eligibility for rotation. This matched Far East Air Forces's replacement schedule. Personnel were rotated with the highest accumulated point totals among those eligible returning first.) During July and August 1944 the group was taken off operations while it received replacements, trained 63 fresh crews in formation flying, practiced bombing, and exchanged its B-25G and C-1/D-1 models for B-25J aircraft. The 823rd BS was the first to become operational with the J, followed soon after by the 405th, which had not received a replacement aircraft in over a year. The group's first combat mission using the B-25J occurred on 5 September 1944. (Note: Several B-25G-1s remained with the 71st and 823rd BS and saw combat on "maximum effort" missions as late as 6 December 1944.)

The 38th BG supported the Allied landings on Morotai on the mornings of 15 and 16 September 1944 by conducting low level missions to spray DDT as an anti-malarial measure on the vegetation-overgrown Pitoe Airfield, located just behind Red Beach. 19 of 21 planned sorties were completed, spraying 3,000 gallons of the pesticide-oil mixture, followed by 2,400 more gallons on 29 September. On 15 October the group moved into Pitoe's new dual-strip airfield to support the Allied invasion of Leyte by bombing airfields, ground installations, harbors, and shipping in the southern Philippines. When the Japanese fleet threatened the beachhead on 24 October during the Battle of Leyte Gulf, the 38th BG was alerted for possible missions, but the fleet did not come within range of the B-25's on Morotai.

On 10 November the 38th BG was ordered to attack a large Japanese ship convoy in Ormoc Bay attempting to land reinforcements. The convoy consisted of three large transports and several smaller merchant vessels, escorted by ten destroyers and patrol craft. 32 bombers of the group took off from Morotai at 0800, two of them returning for mechanical problems, and picked up an escort of 37 P-47 Thunderbolts of the 348th Fighter Group en route to a new fighter base at Tacloban Airfield, Leyte. At 1135 the convoy was sighted, and the group circled to make its approach from the land side. It attacked individual ships in two-plane elements at 150 feet under intense and effective antiaircraft fire from the Japanese naval vessels. In just seven minutes of combat, five of the lead 822nd Squadron's eight bombers were shot down, including the group leader, as were two of the 823rd BS, last over the convoy. The group, which was awarded its fourth Distinguished Unit Citation for the mission, suffered its greatest loss: seven bombers, three complete crews, and 21 dead or missing. While its claims were exaggerated in both tonnage and numbers of vessels sunk, the two largest transports (Note: Per JANAC, Takatsu Maru (5350 tons) and Kashii Maru (8,407 tons).) and a frigate (Note: Per JANAC, Coast Defense Vessel No. 11.) were sunk and serious damage inflicted on the rest of the convoy.

==== Operations in 1945 ====
The group moved forward to Lingayan Field on Luzon on 30 January 1945. The next day the 822nd BS redressed its losses at Ormoc by attacking a three-destroyer convoy near Formosa, sinking the 1500-ton Ume and damaging the other two.

In the first week of February the group provided on-call close air support to US ground forces, directed by P-40 Warhawks of the 71st Reconnaissance Group acting as forward air controllers. (Note: The P-40s were recent hand-downs from fighter groups converting to P-38s. The 71st RG used them briefly while awaiting delivery of new P-51s.) On 2 February, it coordinated with SBD dive bombers of Marine Aircraft Group 24 in bombing Japanese positions defending Umingan against attacks by the U.S. 25th Division, then supported the 1st Cavalry Division as it moved into Manila. The mediums then began a campaign against industries and airfields on Formosa, and attacked shipping along the southeast China coast. Tactics evolved in which formations of 36 aircraft bombed from medium altitudes, while low altitude strafing attacks featured four waves of B-25Js flying nine abreast, such as the attack on the Imperial Japanese Navy airfield at Taichū (台中), Formosa, on 2 March. (Note: The 34 B-25Js that reached the target expended 104,985 rounds of .50 caliber ammunition. Two bombers of the lead squadron were shot down by a flak tower.) The raid of 2 March illustrates the scope of medium bomber operations in the Western Pacific in 1945: attacks in bombardment wing strength using two groups, (Note: Fifth Air Force was not organized into wings but had all its combat groups assigned directly to commands. The 38th BG was the only bombardment group not assigned to V Bomber Command, having been a part of V Fighter Command since 1942.) each group with its own target, (Note: The lead 345th BG bombed Toyohara Airdrome to the north to split the defenses. In addition, two Liberator groups and an A-20 group also attacked Formosan airfields.) employing a mission force of 72 B-25 bombers, 24 P-51 Mustang fighter escorts, and two OA-10 Catalinas on station for rescue operations. On 20 March, the group attacked a small convoy of warships escorting a large freighter near Amoy, China. Flying abreast in four attack waves totaling 22 Mitchells, each squadron lost a bomber in the brief but vicious combat, with two going down in the target area and two others crash-landing at Fourteenth Air Force fields in mainland China.

On 13 May, after evaluating two months of strikes against Formosan targets, group commander Lt. Col. Edwin H. Hawes conceived a sustained campaign to eradicate all Japanese sugar mill/ethanol refineries on Formosa. He formed specially designated two-crew teams from each squadron, each team selecting and bombing a target every fourth day, to provide daily pressure on the industry. The group became known as the "Alcohol Busters". (Note: Aircraft Movement Sheet for mission 158-C-8, 405th Bomb Squadron, of 28 May is the first specific use of the term in official documents. It was also seen in various reporting as the "Alcohol Busters of Formosa" and "Hawes' Alcohol Busters". The campaign ran through the end of May and ultimately attacked 16 targets, destroying 13. 38th Bomb Group Association Part 133 download.)

On 21 June 1945 half of the air echelon of 38th BG (30 B-25s) was sent on short notice to Puerta Princesa Airfield, Palawan, where it was attached to the 42nd Bomb Group of the Thirteenth Air Force to form a nine-squadron wing. (Note: The Palawan tour marked the only time during World War II that the 38th BG flew combat operations with its former 69th and 70th BS.) For the remainder of June it conducted preinvasion low altitude bombing of Japanese installations at Balikpapan, Borneo. Its first mission on 22 June consisted of 54 Mitchells flying 18 abreast in three waves, strafing and dropping air-fused napalm bombs. On the mission of 29 June, the group was forced to attack through the exploding bursts of bombs dropped by B-24 Liberators flying at much higher altitude, losing one B-25. (Note: The 42nd BG and all five of its squadrons received a DUC for this campaign, but the attached squadrons of the 38th did not. This occurred previously in 2 November 1943 attack on Rabaul, in which only the 345th BG was decorated. In all, the 38th participated in six DUC-awarded missions.)

After its return to Lingayen, it conducted training missions until an advanced party flew to Okinawa on 14 July to prepare for the transfer of the group to Yontan Airfield. The ground echelon boarded LSTs on 26 July and moved to Subic Bay, where it remained until the end of the month. It reached Yontan by sea on 8 August. The air echelon flew to Yontan on 25 July and began attacks on industries, railways, and shipping in southern Japan and both coasts of Korea. Japanese home defenses proved effective and seven B-25s were lost in combat between 26 July and 10 August, with only one crew surviving.

38th BG B-25 losses
95	B-25's lost in combat
44	B-25's lost in non-combat accidents
442	Air crew killed or missing in action
All figures from Official History. (Note: Does not include aircraft destroyed on ground or written off as beyond economical repair.)

On the morning of 9 August 1945, ten B-25Js led by Col. Hawes attacked the Japanese aircraft carrier Kaiyo (海鷹), beached in Beppu Bay on Kyushu. Flying three abreast at low level through a thick haze, six of the ten aircraft struck the carrier with five 1000-pound delayed-action demolition bombs. Hawes and his crew were killed when a wingtip of their bomber struck a tree, then the carrier itself, and crashed beside the ship after releasing its bombs. Hawes' Mitchell was the last lost by the group during World War II. (Note: This mission encountered severe haze conditions which the group history speculated might have been part of the atomic cloud of the bombing of Nagasaki that morning, 80 miles to the southwest. However the time over target for the lead squadron was more than an hour before the Nagasaki detonation.)

The 38th Bomb Group flew its final combat mission on 13 August 1945, searching for shipping off the east coast of Korea, and the next morning moved its 54 operational bombers back to Morotai to make room for units involved in the imminent occupation.

=== Post-war duties ===
The 38th BG returned to Yontan from Morotai on 26 September, having lost three additional B-25s to accidents. On 1 October the group transferred out all aircraft with more than 600 hours of flight time, which reduced it to nine B-25s. Okinawa was struck by typhoons on 16 September and 9 October, the latter destroying all tents and structures in the 38th's camp at Yontan, but the bombers were saved by weighting down their wings with sandbags and using full engine power to keep them turned into the wind.

On 1 November the group was designated for movement to Kyushu, to be based at Itazuke Air base near Fukuoka as part of the Far East Air Forces occupation force. On 7 November the group divided into advance and rear echelons and began loading five LSTs for the movement. The convoy sailed on 13 November, offloading at Sasebo by 22 November (it was unable to unload at Fukuoka because the harbor had not been swept of naval mines). On 25 November the aircraft flew from Okinawa to Ashiya Air Base because Itazuke was not yet serviceable. Their crews were trucked 40 miles to Itazuke, followed two days later by the rear air echelon, which arrived in 18 C-47s. The 38th BG began rehabilitation of the base using groups of Japanese laborers.

The 38th BG returned more than 500 men to the United States for demobilization before the end of 1945. In January 1946, it received 16 A-26 Invader bombers at Ashiya for orientation and training, assigned to the 405th BS. A lack of engineering personnel in the group resulted in most of the aircraft being grounded until acceptance inspections could be performed. The group was reduced to three squadrons on 12 April 1946 as both the 822nd and 823rd BS were inactivated and the 89th Bomb Squadron at Itazuke was assigned to the group. (Note: The 822nd would not be reactivated until 1953, and the 823rd did not reactivate until 1962. The 89th BS had formerly been part of the 3rd Bomb Group.)

The group was redesignated as the 38th Bombardment Group (Light) in May 1946 and reassigned to the 315th Air Division. Operational surveillance missions began in April, with two A-26s lost in weather-related crashes in April and May. In September 1946 the group moved to Itami, Japan. The 405th BS was reduced to a paper squadron without aircraft or personnel, then relocated at Itazuke between 1 January and 1 May 1947 to be a basic military training unit, after which it returned to Itami as a non-flying labor unit until the establishment of the USAF. The 71st BS discontinued flight operations on 1 November 1946 and went into an unmanned status until 1 May 1947, when it received new personnel at Itami in preparation for resuming operations. The 89th BS became the sole operational squadron of the group between November 1946 and September 1947.

=== United States Air Force ===
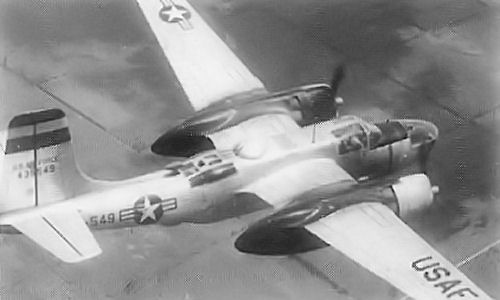
Douglas B-26C Invader of the 822nd Bomb Squadron

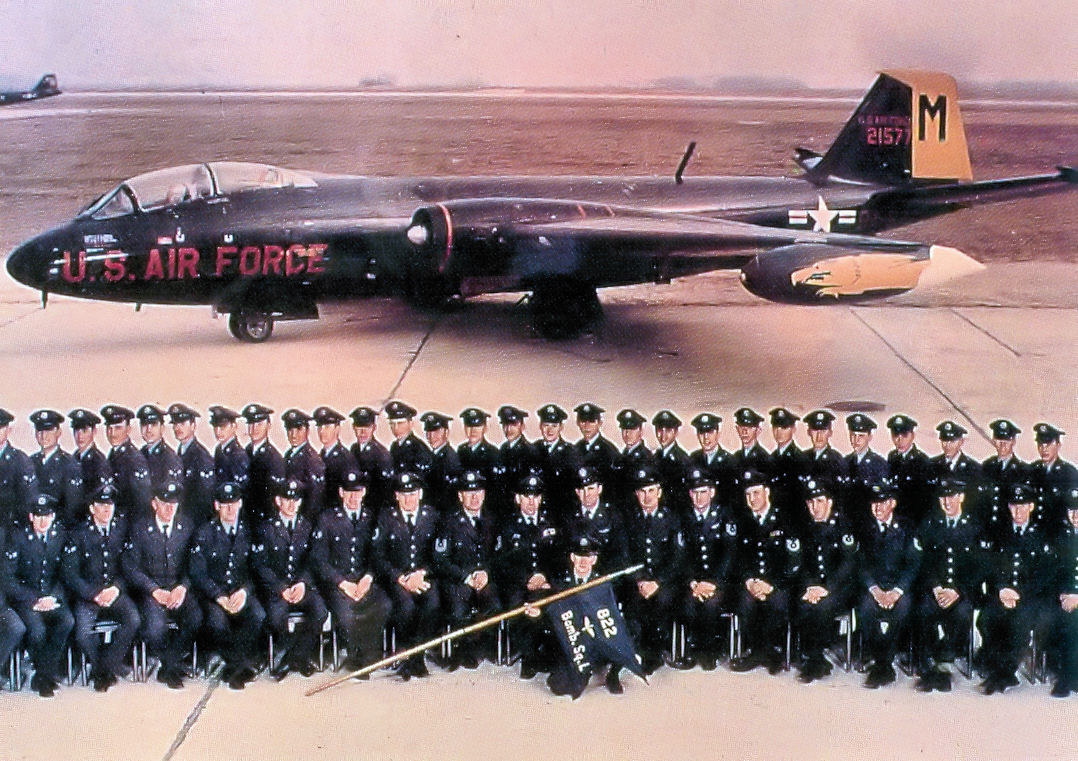
Members of the 822d Bombardment Squadron posing in front of their new Martin B-57B 52-1577 at Laon-Couvron AB, France in 1955.

On 18 September 1947 the 38th Bomb Group became part of the independent United States Air Force. Both the 71st and 405th Squadrons were subsequently re-equipped with B-26C Invader and TB-25 Mitchell aircraft, resuming surveillance and training missions. Under the reorganization of the Air Force wing plan, it was made the combat component of the newly activated 38th Bombardment Wing (Light) on 18 August 1948. It assisted in the air defense of Japan and participated in tactical exercises from August 1948 – March 1949. The 38th Bombardment Group was inactivated in the Far East on 1 April 1949.

The group was reactivated on 1 January 1953 as the 38th Bombardment Group (Tactical), again a subordinate component of the 38th Bomb Wing, now part of United States Air Forces in Europe, and based at Laon-Couvron Air Base, France. The 71st, 405th and 822d Bomb Squadrons were reactivated as the group's flying components. The group absorbed the assets and personnel of the 126th Bomb Group, an Illinois Air National Guard unit that was inactivated and returned to state control.

The group flew the B-26 Invader until April 1955, when it converted to the B-57B Canberra tactical bomber. A total of forty-nine B-57B and eight 2-seat B-57C models for training were deployed to Laon. The 38th Bomb Group was the only tactical bombardment unit assigned to USAFE. The mission of the B-57B was all-weather interdiction using conventional weapons, but it was also nuclear weapons-capable and provided a nuclear deterrence. The Canberras at Laon were painted a gloss black. Using five B-57's, the 38th BG formed its own aerial demonstration team called the Black Knights. They performed at air shows around Western Europe, including the 1957 Paris Air Show. The Black Knights were the only tactical bomber show team in the world.

In 1958, French President Charles de Gaulle announced that all NATO nuclear weapons and delivery aircraft had to be removed from French soil by July 1958. Since the parent wing was nuclear capable by NATO policy, it was ordered to depart France. The 38th BG was inactivated at Laon on 8 December 1957 and its three squadrons assigned directly to the wing while aircraft and personnel were transferred to other units. The wing then moved on 18 June 1958 to Hahn Air Base, Germany, where it was redesignated a tactical missile wing using the TM-61 Matador.

== Honors ==
The honors earned by the group prior to 18 August 1948 were bestowed for display on the 38th Combat Support Wing.

=== Decorations ===

Distinguished Unit Citation, World War II
Papua, September 1942 – 23 January 1943
New Britain, 24–26 December 1943
New Guinea, 16–17 June 1944
Leyte, 10 November 1944

Philippine Presidential Unit Citation
Liberation of the Philippine Islands

=== Service streamers ===

Air Combat, Asiatic-Pacific Theater
Air Offensive, Japan
China Defensive
Papua
New Guinea
Bismarck Archipelago
Western Pacific
Leyte
Luzon
Southern Philippines
China Offensive

== See also ==
- Battle of Ormoc Bay
- Battle of the Bismarck Sea
- Bombing of Rabaul (November 1943)
- Bombing of Wewak
- List of Martin B-26 Marauder operators
- United States Army Air Forces in Australia

== Notes ==
Footnotes

Citations
