= Bombing of Wewak =

Series of air raids on Wewak

Coordinates: 3°33′S 143°38′E

- Part of World War II, Pacific War
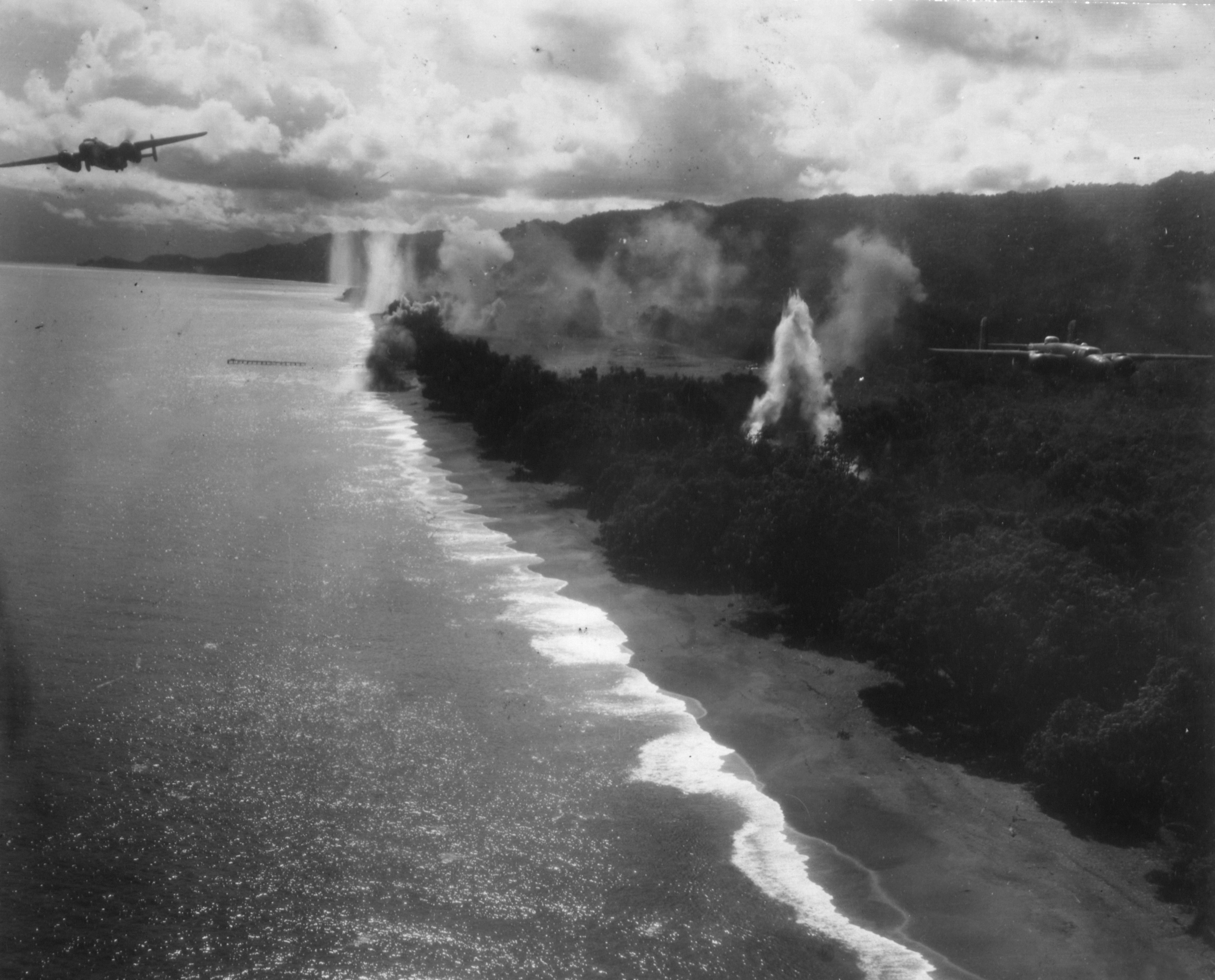
- 13 August 1943, a pair of B-25 Mitchells bombs the Wewak area, in the lead-up to the devastating raids of 17 and 18 August.
Date	17–21 August 1943
Location	Wewak, Territory of New Guinea
Result	Allied victory

Belligerents
United States; Australia	Japan

Commanders and leaders
George Kenney	Kumaichi Teramoto

Strength
47 heavy bombers; 53 medium bombers; 80 fighters	200 aircraft

Casualties and losses
10 destroyed	174 put out of action: 54 shot down 16 blown up 57 badly damaged 47 slightly damaged

The Bombing of Wewak was a series of air raids by the USAAF Fifth Air Force, on 17–21 August 1943, against the major air base of the Imperial Japanese Army Air Force on the mainland of New Guinea, at Wewak. The four raids, over a five-day period, represented a decisive victory for the Allies: the Japanese Fourth Air Army lost about 170 planes on the ground and in the air, reducing its operational strength to about 30 planes. Ten aircraft from the U.S. Fifth Air Force were lost.

== Background ==
By August 1943, the Japanese Fourth Air Army—which had been formed in June for the New Guinea campaign—had 200 aircraft, but only 130 of them were operational and ready for flying. This was one third of its full complement of planes and represented an operational strength of 50%. According to Japanese historian Hiroyuki Shindo: "...the major causes of this low operational rate were widespread illness among the aircrews, along with ... the lack of aircraft replacements." Nevertheless, the planes included state-of-the-art fighters like the Nakajima Ki-43 Hayabusa ("Oscar"), the new in-line-engined Kawasaki Ki-61 Hien ("Tony"), and the twin-engined Kawasaki Ki-45 Toryu ("Nick") ground attack/night fighter.

During the U.S. and Australian Armies' Lae campaign, the Fourth Air Army moved a large number of aircraft out of range of Allied fighters, to a cluster of airfields near Wewak, some 400 miles (650 km) west of the Huon Peninsula. Escort fighters did not have the range to reach Wewak from existing Allied air bases, and the Allies considered large-scale, long-range raids by unescorted heavy bombers to be at risk of heavy losses.

The Allied air commander in the South West Pacific Area, Major General George Kenney, devised a plan for a major attack on Wewak. Allied personnel started construction of two dummy airfields, relatively close to Japanese infantry positions on the Huon Peninsula, north of Lae. Small construction crews created large clouds of dust, to create the impression that major construction was underway. The Japanese responded by frequently bombing the "airfields", and apparently preventing occupation by Allied units. Simultaneously, at Tsili Tsili, 50 mi (43 nmi; 80 km) away, the Allies constructed a real airfield and transferred fighter planes there before the Japanese discovered its existence. (However, the Australian official history says the new, secret base was the separate airfield at nearby Marilinan, 40 mi (35 nmi; 64 km) from Lae.)

On 12 August, the Fourth Air Army began to carry out a wave of raids on the Allied air bases at Mount Hagen, Bena Bena, Wau, Salamaua and elsewhere. Some small Allied raids were undertaken against Wewak.

== Attacks ==
On 17 August, 47 B-24 Liberators and B-17 Flying Fortresses made a pre-dawn attack on the main base at Wewak and satellite airfields at Boram, Dagua and But. Japanese aircraft were parked wing-tip to wing-tip on runways. At Boram, 60 Japanese planes were being warmed up by their crews. Some attempted to take off but were destroyed in the process. At 09:00, more than 30 B-25 Mitchells—escorted by more than 80 P-38 Lightnings—made strafing attacks on Boram, Wewak, and Dagua.

Another attack on the airfields was dispatched on the morning of 18 August to strafe and bomb the fields from low altitude. The 3rd Attack Group was assigned to attack Wewak and Boram fields, while the 38th Bomb Group was sent further west to attack Dagua and But airdromes. Each of the 62 bombers was loaded with 12 clusters of three 23 lb (10 kg) "para-frag" bombs. The small parachutes attached to these "parafrag" bombs slowed them enough for the low-flying American attacker to escape the hail of shrapnel that destroyed the Japanese planes on the ground. Delayed action bombs were also used which left huge craters in the runway and prevented Japanese aircraft from taking off or landing. B-24s of the 90th Bomb Group bombed Wewak from high altitude, while 53 B-25s succeeded in reaching Wewak and attacked the airfields again. Only three U.S. aircraft were shot down in the raids, but in one loss Major Ralph Cheli was awarded the Medal of Honor.

The raids caught the Japanese unprepared. Their New Guinea airbases were inadequate in terms of the concealment of planes, in hangars and other shelters, and they relied almost completely on a visual warning system, which did not allow enough time for aircraft on the ground to take off or be taken under cover. These problems were compounded by the poor quality of runways, a shortage of maintenance staff and a lack of heavy equipment at forward bases. These problems were not restricted to Wewak. According to Australian official historian, during this period, at least 50% of the Japanese aircraft lost were destroyed on the ground.

Two additional raids were conducted on 20 and 21 August. The Fifth Air Force claimed 20 aircraft destroyed on 20 August, and 70 on the final day, half of them shot down in air combat by escorting P-38s.

== Aftermath ==
Colonel Kazuo Tanikawa—an Eighth Area Army staff officer—later said:

At the time of the air attacks on Wewak on 17 and 18 August our defences were not alert. We lost 100 planes including light bombers, fighters and reconnaissance planes. It was a decisive Allied victory. We were planning to regain the balance of air power and were making plans to bomb Port Moresby and other areas. A few days before our projected plan was to materialise, we were bombed at Wewak and our air power was severely crippled. Consequently our air power was rapidly diminishing and was unable to aid our ground forces effectively which, in the end, constituted one of our chief reasons for losing the war.

According to the Fourth Air Army's numbers, out of 200 Japanese airplanes that were at the four Wewak area airbases 174 of them were put out of action. 54 were shot down, 16 were blown up, 57 were badly damaged, and 47 were slightly damaged. The Fourth Air Army had been reduced to an operational strength of about 30 planes, and this meant a virtual end to Japanese air operations in New Guinea until replacements arrived. The Allies could now conduct air operations virtually uncontested as far away as Aitape, whereas previously Madang had been the extent of air operations. The Fourth Air Army recovered to an extent but never again reached the strength it had in August 1943. The last major air combat between Allied and Japanese aircraft took place on 3 June 1944. The final aerial victories of the New Guinea campaign for the USAAF and Royal Australian Air Force occurred in June 1944. By that time the Fourth Air Army had ceased to exist.
