= Ballarat Aviation Museum =

Coordinates: 37.514722°S 143.788375°E

Ballarat Aviation Museum is an Australian aviation museum located at Ballarat Airport in Ballarat, Victoria. Among other exhibits it contains a CAC Wirraway, an Ikara anti-submarine missile, a Mignet Pou-du-Ciel, a MacFarlane (Mac Wonder), an Iskra, a PZL TS-11 Iskra and a Walter HWK 109-509 rocket engine, the type that was used to power the Messerschmitt Me 163 Komet. The Museum also has 2 Link Trainers and many aero engines including a Rolls-Royce Merlin, Griffin and 747. Other exhibits include a range of cameras used for aerial photography, historical aircraft radios and photographs.
