= 1961 Victorian Trophy =

Motor race in Australia

The 1961 Victorian Trophy was an International motor race staged at the Ballarat Air Strip circuit in Victoria, Australia on 12 February 1961. Open to Formula Libre cars, it was contested over 33 laps, a distance of approximately 100 miles (161 km). The race was the feature event of the Ballarat International Meeting, which was organised by the Light Car Club of Australia.

The race was won by American driver Dan Gurney in a BRM P48.

== Results ==
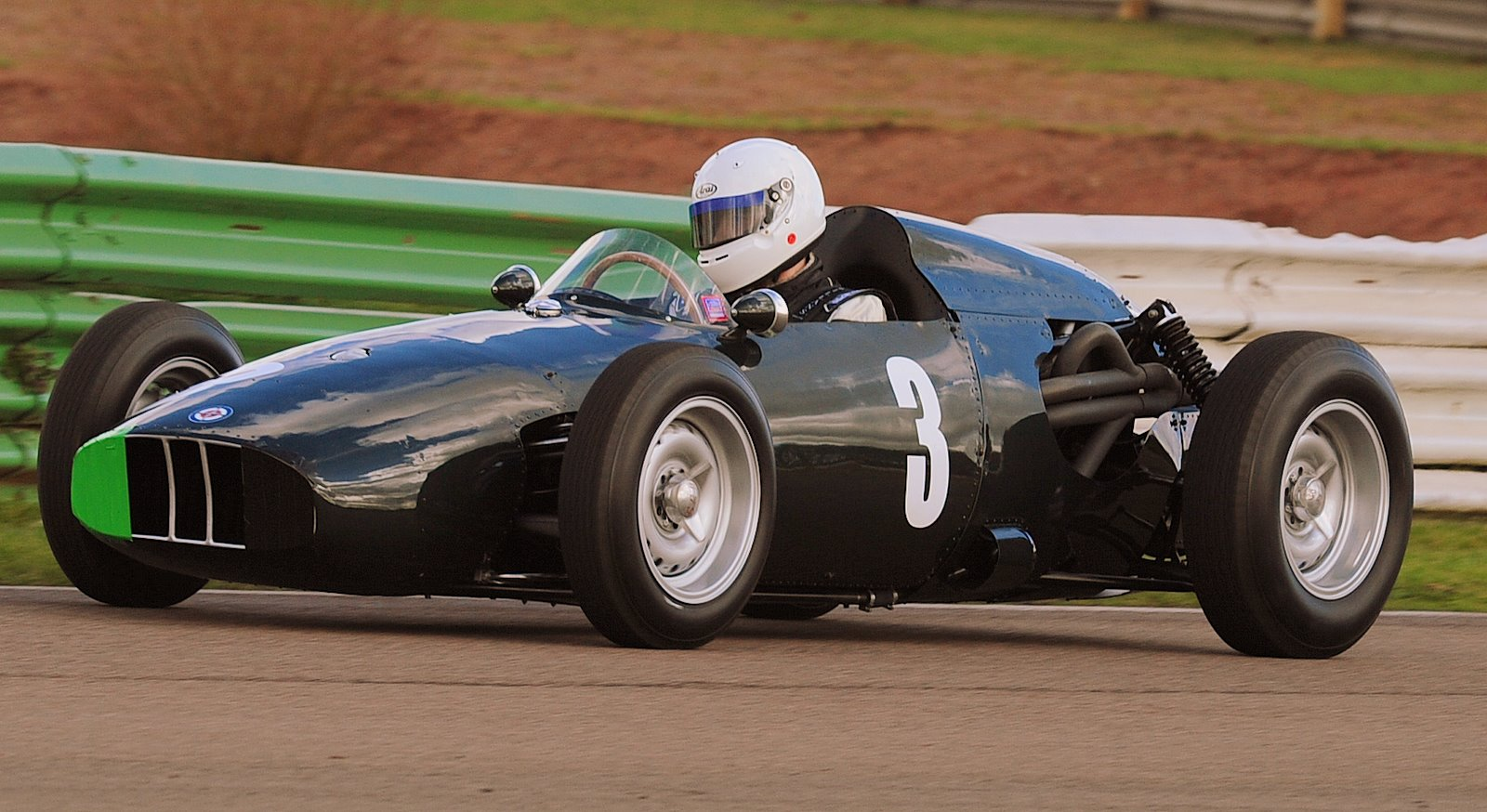
The race was won by a BRM P48, similar to the example pictured above in 2008

Position	Driver	No.	Car	Entrant	Laps
1	Dan Gurney	6	BRM P48	Owen Racing Organisation	33
2	Graham Hill	5	BRM P48	Owen Racing Organisation	33
3	Ron Flockhart	11	Cooper T53 Coventry Climax	R. Flockhart	33
4	Stan Jones	24	Cooper T51 Coventry Climax	Stan Jones Motors	33
5	Bib Stillwell	16	Cooper T51 Coventry Climax	B. S. Stillwell	32
6	Alec Mildren	1	Cooper T51 Maserati	A. G. Mildren Pty. Ltd.	32
7	Arnold Glass	7	Cooper T51 Maserati	Capitol Motors	
8	Austin Miller	60	Cooper T51 Coventry Climax	A. Miller	
9	John Roxburgh	19	Cooper T45 Coventry Climax	J. Roxburgh	
DNF	Jon Leighton	70	Cooper T45 Coventry Climax	Scuderia Birchwood	29
DNF	Lex Davison	4	Aston Martin DBR4/250	A. N. Davison	9
DNF	Innes Ireland	8	Lotus 18 Coventry Climax	Team Lotus	9
DNS	Bill Patterson	9	Cooper T51 Coventry Climax	Bill Patterson Motors Pty. Ltd.	-
DNS	Mel McEwin	65	Tornado Mk II Chevrolet Corvette	M. McEwin	-

=== Notes ===
- Fastest lap: Hill & Flockhart: 1 min. 50 sec. (New lap record)
