= Ralph Cheli =

US Army Air Forces Medal of Honor recipient (1919–1944)

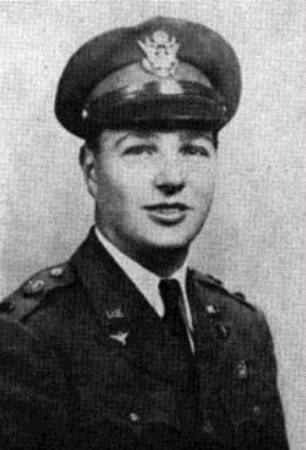
- Born: October 29, 1919; San Francisco, California, US
- Died: March 6, 1944 (aged 24); Rabaul, New Britain
- Burial place: Jefferson Barracks National Cemetery St. Louis, Missouri
- Military career
- Allegiance: United States of America
- Branch: United States Army Air Forces
- Service years: 1940–1944
- Rank: Major
- Commands: 405th Bombardment Squadron, 38th Bomb Group (Medium)
- Conflicts: World War II
- Awards: Medal of Honor; Distinguished Flying Cross; Purple Heart; Air Medal

Ralph Cheli (pronounced "Kelly" /ˈkɛli/; October 29, 1919 – March 6, 1944) was a major in the United States Army Air Forces and a recipient of the Medal of Honor. He served as the commanding officer of the 405th Bombardment Squadron (Medium) in the Fifth Air Force's 38th Bombardment Group, based at Durand Airfield, Port Moresby, New Guinea.

On August 18, 1943, while leading his group of B-25 Mitchells on a low level attack of two Japanese airfields, his bomber was severely damaged. Cheli pressed the attack despite the battle damage, then crash-landed his bomber at sea. He was made a prisoner-of-war and on March 6, 1944, was executed by his captors. During the period when his status was unknown, Cheli was nominated for the Medal of Honor, which he was awarded in October 1943.

== Biography ==
Born in San Francisco to Robert Alfred Cheli and Julia Cheli (née Martinelli; San Francisco, March 27, 1893-Piediluco, February 9, 1993), he attended Lehigh University as member of the class of 1941. In February 1940, during his junior year, he left Lehigh to enlist in the USAAF as an aviation cadet. He undertook primary flying training at Tulsa, Oklahoma; basic flight training at Randolph Field, Texas; and multi-engine advanced training at Kelly Field, Texas.

After commissioning as a second lieutenant in November, Cheli was assigned as a B-17 Flying Fortress co-pilot in the 21st Reconnaissance Squadron, operating from Miami, Florida, under the 3rd Bombardment Wing of General Headquarters Air Force. After attending the Chemical Warfare School at Edgewood Arsenal, Maryland, he rejoined the 21st RS at MacDill Field, Florida, where it had been attached to the 29th Bomb Group. When the United States entered World War II, Cheli was promoted to 1st lieutenant in February 1942 and flew anti-submarine patrols in the Caribbean Sea as a B-17 pilot with the 43rd Bomb Squadron (29th BG).

Cheli advanced to captain in June 1942 and was transferred to the 38th Bomb Group at Barksdale Field, Louisiana, where he was assigned as Operations Officer of the 405th Bomb Squadron "Green Dragons". In August Cheli led a flight of B-25s from Hamilton Field, California, to Australia in the first air movement of B-25s to the Southwest Pacific war zone. Two months later, the 38th moved forward to Port Moresby, where Cheli was assigned command of the 405th BS after the death of its previous commander on January 5, 1943. He was promoted to major in March.

On March 3, 1943, during the Battle of the Bismarck Sea, Cheli led the 405th Bomb Squadron in the first daylight "masthead" (low level) attack against a Japanese shipping convoy, one of the first skip bombing raids. In all he flew 39 combat missions and earned the Distinguished Flying Cross and the Air Medal.

== Medal of Honor mission ==
In August 1943, the Fifth Air Force was supporting the Allies' strategic plan of advance toward the Philippines along the north coast of New Guinea. Its next stage, scheduled for early September, was the seizure of the Japanese base at Lae. The immediate goal of the Fifth Air Force was the neutralization of Japanese airpower concentrated at Wewak, some 300 miles west of Lae. Wewak and its satellite fields at But, Boram, and Dagua, based more than 100 bombers and about 90 fighters. The 500+-mile flight to Wewak was the deepest penetration into Japanese-held territory yet made by medium bombers.

On the night of August 16, 50 heavy bombers attacked the fields, followed on the morning of the 17th by 32 B-25s, escorted by 80 P-38 Lightnings. Both attacks encountered intense antiaircraft fire but little fighter opposition. Another attack on the airfields was dispatched on the morning of August 18 to strafe and drop the fields from low altitude. The 3rd Attack Group was assigned to attack Wewak and Boram fields, while the 38th BG was sent further west to attack Dagua and But airdromes. Each bomber was loaded with 12 3-bomb clusters of 23-pound "para-frag" bombs, which the 405th BS would drop on Dagua and the 71st BS on But.

Cheli was assigned to lead the 38th BG, 30 B-25 Mitchells including stand-bys. Bad weather en route separated the force from its P-38 cover escort, and mechanical problems reduced each squadron by one Mitchell, leaving his 405th and the following 71st Squadrons to attack with 28 B-25s. His assigned aircraft that day was B-25D-1 (s/n 41-30117), a bomber field-modified into a strafer by enclosure of its plexiglass nose to mounting of four forward-firing machine guns, and a pair of fuselage side "blister packs" mounting guns that also fired forward.

While maneuvering 150 feet above the ground to attack the heavily defended airfield, the force came under a 10 minute assult from 10–15 Japanese Oscar fighters diving from the clouds. Several fighters concentrated their fire on Cheli's bomber, bomber, igniting its right engine two miles from the target; the flames rapidly spread to the nose and cockpit.

His speed would have enabled him to gain necessary altitude to parachute to safety, but this action would have resulted in his formation becoming disorganized and exposed to the enemy. Although a crash was inevitable, he elected to continue leading the attack. From a minimum altitude, the squadron made a devastating bombing and strafing attack on the target. Maj. Cheli directed his wingman to lead the formation. His aircraft flew southeast to the vicinity of Boram airfield, where it crash-landed in the sea about 2 kilometers offshore.

Initially he was believed killed in the crash, but post war evidence indicates that he survived the crash but was executed in March 1944 by the Japanese while a POW on Rabaul. For his actions, he posthumously received the Medal of Honor. What are believed to be Major Cheli's and other similarly executed POWs remains are now interred at Jefferson Barracks National Cemetery in St. Louis, Missouri.

Cheli was survived by his wife, Geraldine Cheli (née Reilly), and infant son, Ralph Jr. The Arnold Air Society chapter at his alma mater Lehigh University was named in his honor. Between 1947 and 1961 the United States Air Force operated the Cheli Air Force Station near Maywood, California.

== Awards and decorations ==

Army Air Forces Pilot Badge
Medal of Honor (posthumous)	Distinguished Flying Cross	Purple Heart (posthumous)
Air Medal	Prisoner of War Medal (posthumous)	American Defense Service Medal
American Campaign Medal	Asiatic-Pacific Campaign Medal with three bronze campaign stars	World War II Victory Medal (posthumous)

=== Medal of Honor citation ===
Rank and organization: Major, U.S. Army Air Corps. Place and date: Near Wewak, New Guinea, August 18, 1943. Entered service at: Brooklyn, N.Y. Birth: San Francisco, Calif. G.O. No.: 72, October 28, 1943.

Citation:

For conspicuous gallantry and intrepidity above and beyond the call of duty in action with the enemy. While Maj. Cheli was leading his squadron in a dive to attack the heavily defended Dagua Airdrome, intercepting enemy aircraft centered their fire on his plane, causing it to burst into flames while still 2 miles from the objective. His speed would have enabled him to gain necessary altitude to parachute to safety, but this action would have resulted in his formation becoming disorganized and exposed to the enemy. Although a crash was inevitable, he courageously elected to continue leading the attack in his blazing plane. From a minimum altitude, the squadron made a devastating bombing and strafing attack on the target. The mission completed, Maj. Cheli instructed his wingman to lead the formation and crashed into the sea.

== See also ==
- List of Medal of Honor recipients for World War II
- List of Italian American Medal of Honor recipients
