= Friends of the Anson Air Museum =

Aviation museum

Coordinates: 37.5188°S 143.7878°E

Friends of the Anson Air Museum is an Australian aviation museum located in Ballarat, Victoria. It is housed in the gym of the former Royal Australian Air Force base at what is now Ballarat Airport. It houses an Avro Anson aircraft currently under restoration and an exhibition on World War II and Australia's part in it.
