= 89th Tactical Missile Squadron =

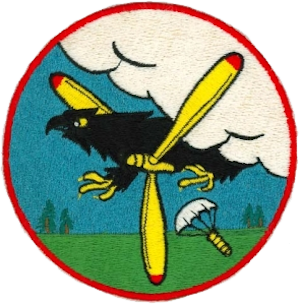
- Active: 1940-1949; 1962-1966; 1985-1990
- Country: United States
- Branch: United States Air Force
- Type: Tactical Missile
- Engagements: World War II

The 89th Tactical Missile Squadron is an inactive United States Air Force unit. Its last assignment was with the 38th Tactical Missile Wing, based at Pydna Missile Base at Wüschheim Air Station, West Germany. It was inactivated on 22 August 1990.

== History ==
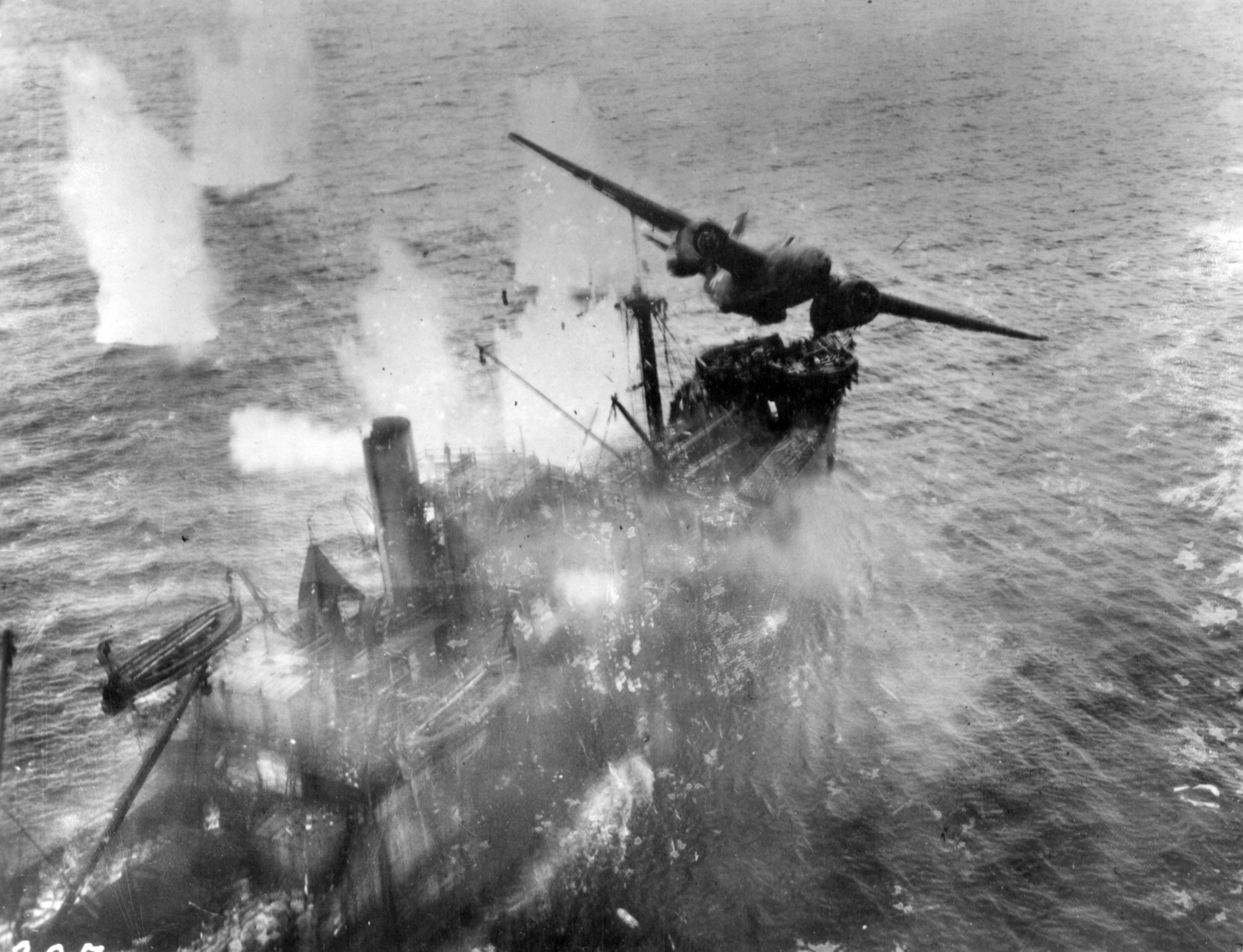
U.S. A-20 Havoc of the 89th Squadron, 3rd Attack Group, at the moment it clears a Japanese merchant ship following a successful skip bombing attack. Wewak, New Guinea, March 1944

The squadron was established in early 1941 as a reconnaissance squadron equipped with the Douglas B-18 Bolo. After the Pearl Harbor Attack, it flew antisubmarine missions over the southeast Atlantic coast.

In February 1942, the squadron was deployed to the Southwest Pacific, flying Douglas A-20 Havoc and North American B-25 Mitchell medium bombers. During the Battle of the Bismarck Sea, it engaged in the first sea-level attack by B-25 Mitchells in World War II and demonstrated that this tactic was extremely effective. The squadron also participated in the raids on Wewak, New Guinea, which were preemptive strikes that virtually ended the threat of enemy offensive air capabilities. In 1945, the squadron converted to the Douglas A-26 Invader.

After World War II, the squadron moved to Japan and was reassigned to the 38th Bombardment Group. it performed occupation duty throughout the late 1940s and was inactivated in 1949 due to budget reductions.

The squadron was reactivated in 1962 as a MGM-13 Mace NATO tactical missile squadron, stationed in West Germany. It maintained missiles until the MGM-13 was withdrawn from service in 1966.

The unit was again reactivated as a BGM-109G Gryphon cruise missile squadron in April 1985. It maintained 80 operational missiles in a combat-ready state. In August 1990 it was inactivated as a result of the Intermediate-Range Nuclear Forces Treaty and the elimination of the BGM-109G missile from service.

=== Lineage ===
- Constituted 10th Reconnaissance Squadron (Light) on 20 November 1940.

Activated on 15 January 1941
Redesignated: 89th Bombardment Squadron (Light) on 14 August 1941
Redesignated: 89th Bombardment Squadron (Dive) on 28 September 1942
Redesignated: 89th Bombardment Squadron (Light) on 25 May 1943
Inactivated on 1 April 1949

- Redesignated 89th Tactical Missile Squadron, and activated, on 10 September 1962

Organized on 25 September 1962.
Inactivated on 25 September 1966.

- Reactivated on 1 April 1985

Inactivated on 22 August 1990

=== Assignments ===
- 3d Bombardment Group, 15 January 1941
- 38th Bombardment Group, 6 May 1946 – 1 April 1949
- United States Air Forces in Europe, 10 September 1962
- 38th Tactical Missile Wing, 25 September 1962 – 25 September 1966; 1 April 1985 – 22 August 1990

=== Stations ===
- Hunter Field, Georgia, 15 January 1941 – 20 January 1942
- Archerfield Airport, Brisbane, Australia, 25 February 1942
- Charters Towers Airfield, Australia, 8 March 1942
- Kila Airfield (3 Mile Drome), Port Moresby, New Guinea, c. 1 September 1942
- Dobodura Airfield Complex, New Guinea, c. 9 May 1943
- Nadzab Airfield Complex, New Guinea, c. 31 January 1944
- Hollandia Airfield Complex, Netherlands East Indies, 13 May 1944
- Dulag Airfield, Leyte, Philippines, c. 7 November 1944
- McGuire Field, San Jose, Mindoro, Philippines, c. 30 December 1944
- Motobu Airfield, Okinawa, 6 August 1945
- Atsugi Air Base, Japan, 8 September 1945
- Itazuke Air Base, Japan, 10 April 1946
- Itami Air Base, Japan, September 1946 - 1 April 1949
- Hahn AB, West Germany, 25 September 1962 – 25 September 1966.
- Wueschheim AS, West Germany, 1 April 1985 – 22 August 1990

50°02′37″N 007°25′32″E

Dispersed Mace missile location

- Site IV "Veronica" - 7.0 miles (11.3 km) ENE of Hahn AB 49°59′58″N 007°23′58″E

Closed since 1967. Missile shelters torn down, in very dilapidated state, appears to be used as a storage yard.

=== Aircraft and missiles ===
- B-18 Bolo and A-18 Shrike, 1941
- A-20 Havoc, 1941–1945
- B-25 Mitchell, 1942
- A-26 (later B-26) Invader, 1945–1949
- MGM-13 Mace, 1962–1966
- BGM-109G Gryphon 1986–1990

== See also ==
- List of United States Air Force missile squadrons
