= Cheli Air Force Station =

Former U. S. Air Force installation in Bell, California

Location
- Coordinates: 33.99889°N 118.170556°W

Site history
- Built: 1943-1947

Garrison information
- Occupants: 1943–1947: United States Army Air Forces; 1947–1961: United States Air Force; 1961–1967: General Services Administration; 1967–: United States Postal Service, United States Army Reserve

Cheli Air Force Station, in Bell, southeastern Los Angeles County, California, was a United States Air Force installation and a Cold War Radar Bomb Scoring site of the Strategic Air Command, from 1947 to 1961.

== History ==
It was originally a U.S. Army Air Forces depot, from 1943, during World War II, to 1947. Since its closure, in 1961, has housed facilities of the United States Postal Service, United States Army Reserve, and the California Army National Guard.

=== Maywood Army Air Forces Specialized Storage Depot ===
The 91.48 acres (37.02 ha) military site was established as the Maywood Army Air Forces Specialized Storage Depot in 1943 during World War II, and was part of Air Materiel Command. The function of the depot was to store and distribute aircraft parts. The site was transferred to the United States Air Force (USAF) when it became a separate service branch from the Army Air Force in 1947.

=== Cheli Air Force Station ===
Cheli Air Force Station was named when the military installation was transferred to the USAF in 1947, in honor of San Francisco born Medal of Honor recipient Major Ralph Cheli.

Cheli AFS had 31 military and 1,139 civilians on 30 June 1958.

==== Los Angeles Bomb Plot—Radar Bomb Scoring ====
The Los Angeles Bomb Plot, or LA Bomb Plot #7 or Los Angeles RBS, was a Radar Bomb Scoring (RBS) site of the Radar Bomb Scoring Division, established at Cheli Air Force Station c. 1952, for evaluating bomber training missions on practice targets in Southern California. The site was first controlled by Detachment 8 of the 3903rd Radar Bomb Scoring Group in 1952, redesignated the 11th Radar Bomb Scoring SQ in 1953, which was commanded by Lt Col James O. McHan.

The Los Angeles Bomb Plot RBS site was near Beale AFB, Castle AFB, and March AFB bomber bases, as well as the Brown Field Bombing Range, Camp Beale Bombing Range, Madera Bombing Range, Muroc Bomb & Gunnery Range, Saline Valley Bombing Range, and Trabuca Bombing Range. Bomb run locations included those of a Castle AFB bomber using the "A/B Santa Barbara" Initial Point and the " LA # 'I' " target.

The radar site closed in 1961, after the Los Angeles RBS unit moved to a Wall, South Dakota RBS site, located at the Badlands Bombing Range which had opened in August 1960.

=== Units ===
Known units serving at the Maywood Army Air Forces Specialized Storage Depot and Cheli AFS/Los Angeles Bomb Plot include:

- 822th Army Air Forces Specialized Depot — Maywood Army Air Forces Specialized Storage Depot
- 4822th Army Air Forces Base Unit (Specialized Depot) — Maywood Army Air Forces Specialized Storage Depot
- Office of Special Investigations, District 18 — Cheli Air Force Station
- 3903rd Radar Bomb Scoring Group, Detachment 8 — Los Angeles Bomb Plot, Cheli AFS
- 11th Radar Bomb Scoring Squadron — Los Angeles Bomb Plot, Cheli AFS

=== Closure ===
After the Los Angeles Bomb Plot/Los Angeles RBS closed on 3 November 1961, the Cheli Air Force Station was closed in accordance with Air Force Special Orders G-132, on 28 November 1961. The federal General Services Administration (GSA) received control of the property. In 1972 the property was transferred from the GSA to the United States Post Office (later United States Postal Service). The final formal transfer of 64.68 acres (26.18 ha) of land to the USPS was on 23 January 1976. The remaining 27 acres (11 ha) of the former Cheli AFS were transferred to the U.S. Army in 1974 for the Patton United States Army Reserve Center. A portion is also used by the California Army National Guard. Additional Cheli AFS parcels were transferred in 2004.

== See also ==
- Cold War history of the United States
- Cold War military history of the United States
