= Lingayen Airport =

Airport in Pangasinan, Philippines

Lingayen Airport Paliparan ng Lingayen Pagtayaban ti Lingayen
- IATA: none; ICAO: RPUG

Summary
- Airport type: Public
- Operator: Civil Aviation Authority of the Philippines
- Serves: Lingayen, Pangasinan
- Elevation AMSL: 2 m / 7 ft
- Coordinates: 16°02′06.21″N 120°14′29.81″E

Map

Runways
Direction	Length		Surface
Direction	m	ft	Surface
08/26	1,043	3,422	Asphalt

Statistics (2014)
- Passengers: 20,859
- Metric tonnes of cargo: 0
- Source: World Aero Data Statistics from the Civil Aviation Authority of the Philippines.

Lingayen Airport (Filipino: Paliparan ng Lingayen, Ilocano: Pagtayaban ti Lingayen) (ICAO: RPUG) is the airport serving the general area of Lingayen, the capital of the province of Pangasinan in the Philippines. It is one of two airports in the province: the other being Rosales Airport. It is classified as a community airport by the Civil Aviation Authority of the Philippines. The airport was built by the Americans in 1945.

== History ==
During World War II, "Lingayen Airfield" was located at the town of Lingayen, parallel to the beach running roughly east to west along Lingayen Gulf. The airfield was also known as "Lingayen Aerodrome" or "Lingayen Field".

The airfield was built prior to the war by the Americans (possibly Philippine Army). It was used as a landing field by US pilots flying familiarization flights in North Luzon. A Philippine Army contingent (most likely the troops of the 21st Division) was also stationed in the area. When the Japanese struck Clark and Iba Fields on December 8, 1941, some of the USAAC pilots landed their P-40s at Lingayen.

The airfield was seized by the Japanese army when they landed at Lingayen Gulf on 25 December 1941. During the Japanese occupation of the Philippines, the airfield was extensively used by Japanese Army and Navy aircraft, flying from Formosa and Japan.

After the American landing at Lingayen Gulf on 9 January 1945, this area was liberated on the first day. The airfield was repaired and improved, including a portion on the beach built by the 836th Engineer Aviation Battalion, and Filipino labor, using 'sawali' (woven palm fronds) with marston matting over top to form the surface of the runway, to keep the sand down. The repairs were completed in late February 1945 and it was immediately put into use by fighter and tactical reconnaissance squadrons, and was capable of handling B-25 and larger aircraft. Lingayen Airfield was also used as an emergency field for damaged bombers returning from strikes on Formosa that were too damaged to reach Clark Field.

With the end of the war, the runways of the airfield were shortened, and it became the small regional airport which it is today.

=== Units assigned to Lingayen Airfield ===
- 309th Bombardment Wing (29 May-12 October 1945)
- 38th Bombardment Group (30 January-25 July 1945)
- 35th Fighter Group (10–19 April 1945)
- 49th Fighter Group (25 February-16 August 1945)
- 475th Fighter Group (20 April-8 August 1945)
- 547th Night Fighter Squadron (18 January-13 August 1945)

== Incidents and accidents ==
- On May 12, 2008, at 10:25 a.m., a Cessna training aircraft piloted by an Indian student pilot crash-landed at the airport. No deaths were reported.
- On February 8, 2011, a Cessna 150 training aircraft crash-landed after hitting the perimeter fence. The student trainees were injured and taken to hospital.
- On January 27, 2012, a Cessna 152 training aircraft carrying a flight instructor and a student slammed into a tricycle on take-off at the airport.
- On March 30, 2025, a Cessna training aircraft crashed following take-off outside the airport, killing its two occupants.

== See also ==
- USAAF in the Southwest Pacific
