= Ballarat Airport =

Airport in Ballarat, Victoria, Australia

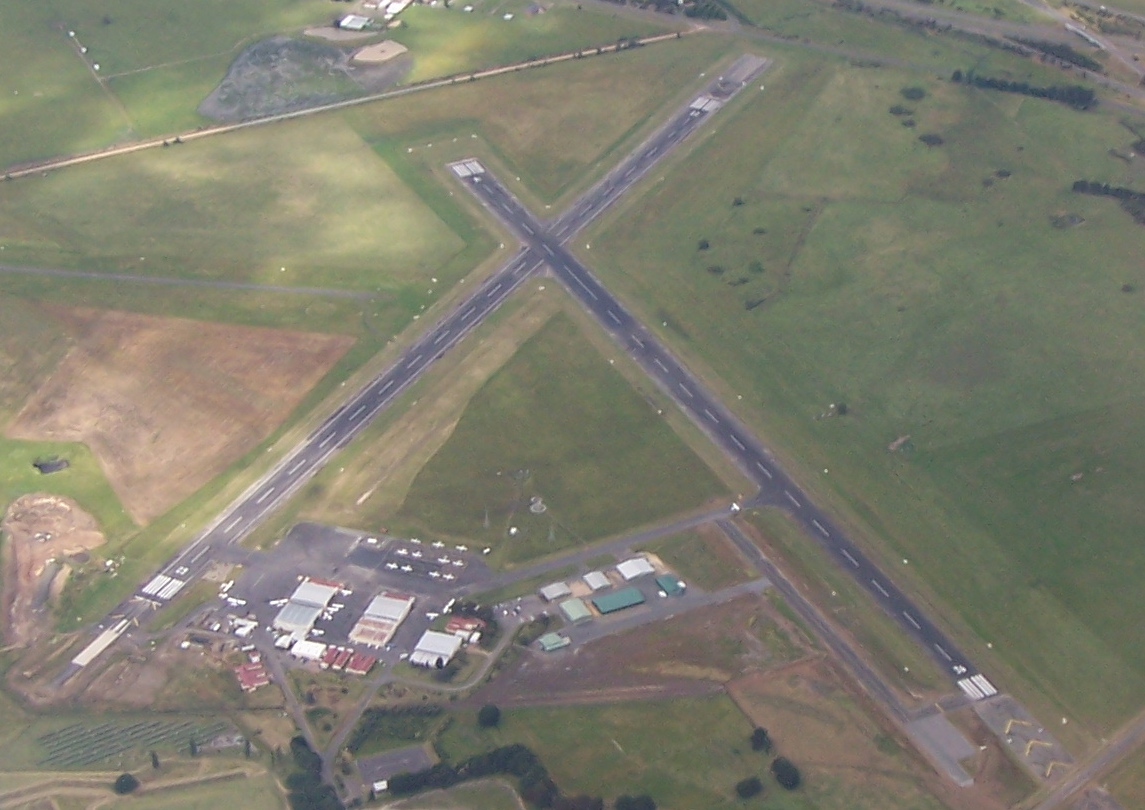
- IATA: none; ICAO: YBLT

Summary
- Airport type: Public
- Operator: City of Ballarat
- Location: Mitchell Park, Ballarat, Victoria
- Elevation AMSL: 1,433 ft / 437 m
- Coordinates: 37°30′33″S 143°47′40″E

Map
- Location in Victoria

Runways
Direction	Length		Surface
Direction	m	ft	Surface
05/23	1,265	4,150	Asphalt
13/31	568	1,864	Grass
18/36	1,798	5,899	Asphalt
- Sources: Australian AIP and aerodrome chart

Ballarat Airport (known officially as the Ballarat Aerodrome) (ICAO: YBLT) is located 4 nautical miles (7.4 km; 4.6 mi) west of Ballarat in the outer suburb of Mitchell Park, Victoria, Australia.

== History ==
Pilot training was first offered on the Ballarat Common in 1914–15 by R.G. Carey with his Bleriot, who later relocated his operations to Port Melbourne. In May 1929 a landing ground was established on the Ballarat Common in Wendouree, north of the railway line adjacent to the "Flax Mill Swamp". By 1930 this had become a licensed aerodrome number 240 and in July 1930, a contract had been let to C. Lundbrook and Sons, to construct a tin hangar capable of accommodating 3 folding wing Moths

By 1939, a larger parcel of land on the Ballarat Common in Mitchell Park was being prepared as the site for new civilian aerodrome as licensed aerodrome number 562.

=== No. 1 Wireless Air Gunners School (1 WAGS) ===
In 1940, the new site was resumed by the Commonwealth of Australia, and a Royal Australian Air Force (RAAF) airfield known as Empire Air Training Scheme No 1 Wireless Air Gunners School was established (EATS 1 WAGS) at the Ballarat Showgrounds on 22 April 1940.

The tin hangar on the original aerodrome site was relocated to the Commonwealth Flax Mill while four Bellman hangars and numerous "P" (personnel) Huts were erected on the new site. In mid-1940, the Wireless Air Gunners School relocated to the aerodrome. During its operation as a WAGS, the wireless operators were mainly trained in panel vans and, from mid-1941, in CAC Wackett trainer aircraft.

The Wackett was used up until 1941, and then an Avro Anson was used up until 1945. The Avro Anson was a twin-engined aeroplane, coloured yellow for training purposes. It was flown around the Ballarat region and western Victoria.

No 1 WAGS was disbanded on 31 December 1945.

=== Post War ===
Unlike many other EATS sites, the RAAF retained the airfield as its Radio School until 1961. The then-Shire of Ballarat negotiated with the Department of Interior to become the civil operator of the airfield and sought the maintenance on site of the hangars and other structures, but a majority of the P Huts were sold by the Commonwealth.

In 2006, the aerodrome was recommended for listing on the Victorian Heritage Register due to its ability to illustrate the Empire Air Training Scheme in Victoria. The site was included on the register on 27 July 2007.

The aerodrome continues to perform an important role in emergency services operations, civil operations and flight training, and as accommodation for many community groups and organisations. The Ballarat Aviation Museum is located at the airport, as is the Friends of the Anson Air Museum.

Work commenced in December 2022 to extend runway 18/36 to 1,800 m (5,900 ft).

== Motorsport ==
Ballarat
- Location: Ballarat, Victoria, Australia
- Operator: Light Car Club of Australia; Victorian Sporting Car Club
- Opened: 26 January 1947
- Closed: 12 February 1961
- Major events: Victoria Cup, Victoria Trophy
- Length: 5.1 km (3.2 mi)
- Turns: 6
- Race lap record: 1:51 (Dan Gurney, BRM P48, 1961, Formula Libre)

The airfield had a brief motor racing career, beginning on Australia Day in 1947 when it held its first motor race meeting. Racing returned in November of both 1950 and 1951, then finally for an International Formula Libre race, the 1961 Victorian Trophy, in February 1961, which was attended by some European Formula One teams. BRM factory drivers Dan Gurney and Graham Hill finished first and second in the major race, the Victoria Trophy, with Ron Flockhart third in a Cooper. Famously on the night before the race Gurney's car was stolen from its hangar and driven into or hidden with, hay bales out on the track with minimal damage.

== See also ==
- United States Army Air Forces in Australia (World War II)
- List of airports in Victoria
