= 399th Tactical Missile Wing =

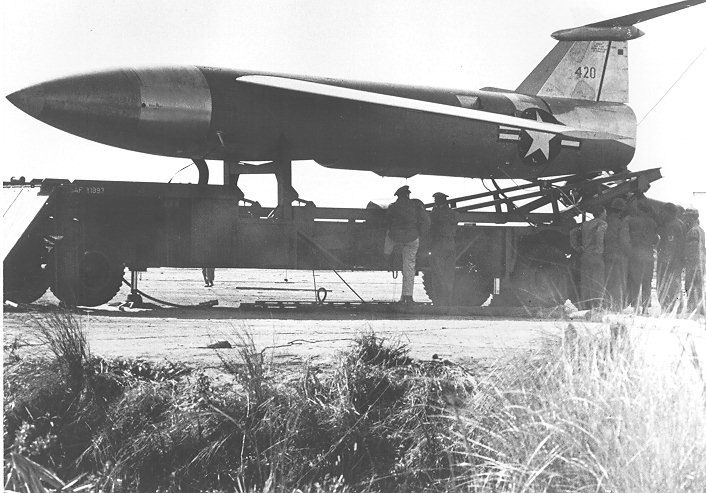
- TM-61 Matador training missile
- Active: 1943–1944; 1957–1958
- Country: United States
- Branch: United States Air Force
- Role: heavy bomber, then cruise missile training

Commanders
- Notable commanders: Lewis S. Norman

The 399th Tactical Missile Wing is an inactive United States Air Force unit. The unit was formed in 1985 by the consolidation of two inactive units.

The 399th Bombardment Group was activated in March 1943 and served as an Operational Training Unit, then as a Replacement Training Unit until it was disbanded in March 1944 when the Army Air Forces reorganized its training and support units in the United States.

The 589th Tactical Missile Group was a TM-61 Matador training unit, which served in Florida from 1957 through 1958.

== History ==
=== Bombardment training ===
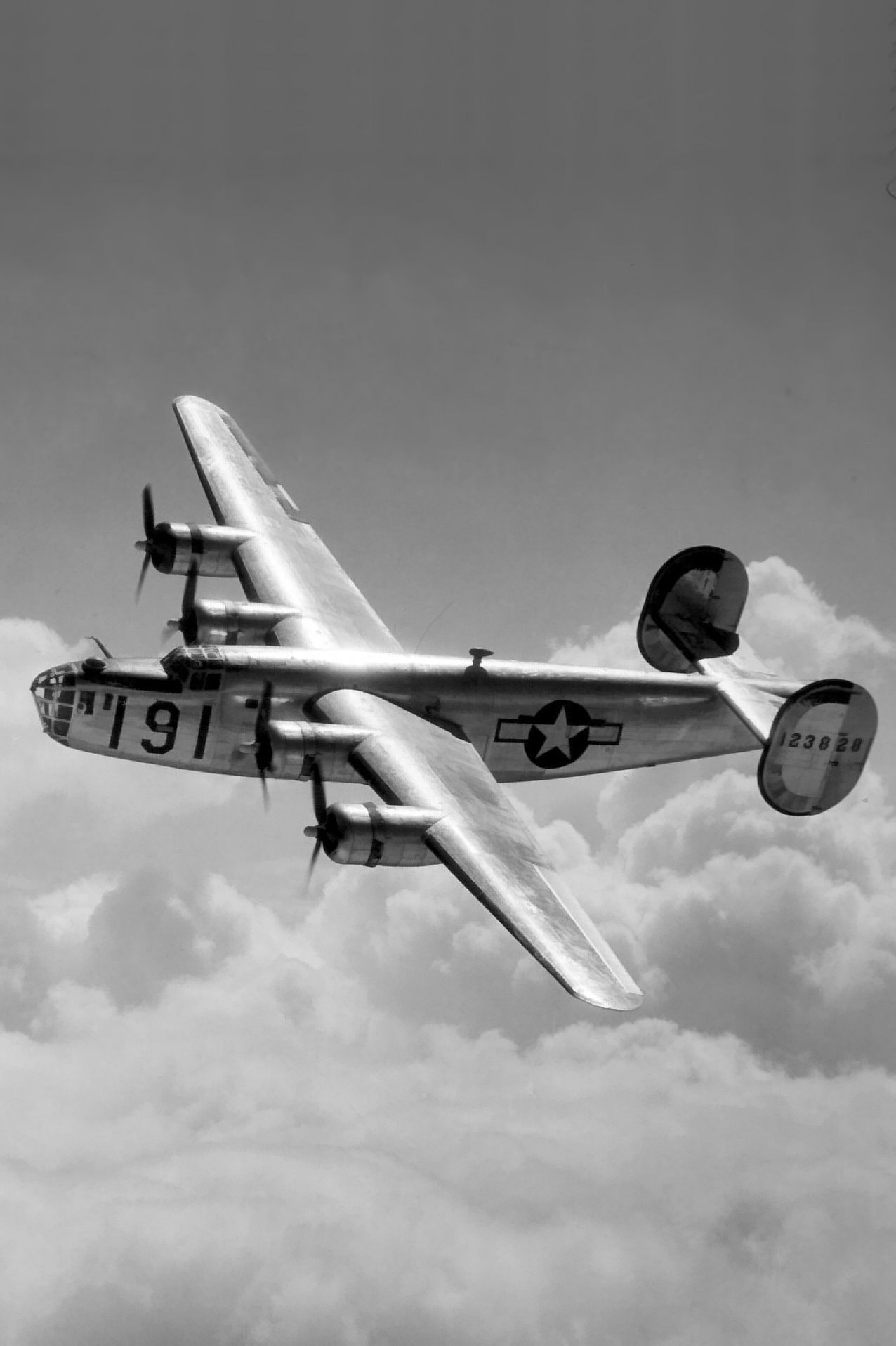
B-24 Liberator as flown by the group

The wing's first predecessor was the 399th Bombardment Group, which was activated at Davis-Monthan Field, Arizona on 1 March 1943, but made two moves the following month, arriving at Wendover Field, Utah on 27 April. The group was composed of the 604th, 605th, 606th, and 607th Bombardment Squadrons. At Wendover, it served as an Operational Training Unit (OTU) for Consolidated B-24 Liberator units until August. The OTU program involved the use of an oversized parent unit to provide cadres to "satellite groups".

The group became a Replacement Training Unit (RTU). Like OTUs, RTUs were oversize units, however their mission was to train individual pilots and aircrews. Following this mission change, the 399th was reassigned from Second Air Force to Fourth Air Force, then moved to March Field, California in December.

However, the Army Air Forces was finding that standard military units like the 399th, which were assigned personnel and equipment based on relatively inflexible tables of organization were not proving well adapted to the training mission. Accordingly, it adopted a more functional system in which each base was organized into a separate numbered unit, which was manned and equipped based on the station's requirements. The 399th Group was disbanded, and along with its elements and supporting units at March was used to form the 420th AAF Base Unit (Bombardment Replacement Training Unit-Heavy).

=== Missile training ===
The second predecessor of the wing was the 589th Tactical Missile Group, which was activated at Orlando Air Force Base, Florida on 8 March 1957 as a training unit for the TM-61 Matador cruise missile. The group formed part of the 4504th Tactical Missile Wing. In April 1958, the group's missile squadron, the 24th Tactical Missile Squadron was transferred to the 588th Tactical Missile Group, when the 588th's 17th Tactical Missile Squadron deployed to Taiwan independently and plans were developed to deploy the 588th to Osan Air Base, South Korea. Although the 24th engaged in crew training at Orlando, it never received any missiles. The squadron did, however, deploy to Cape Canaveral Air Force Station, where it launched TM-61 Matador missiles under the guidance of the 6555th Guided Missile Squadron. The group was then inactivated on 8 June 58, when its training functions were assigned directly to the 4504th Wing's 4504th Missile Training Squadron.

The 399th Bombardment Group was reconstituted in July 1985 and consolidated with the 589th Tactical Missile Group as the 399th Tactical Missile Wing, but has not been active since.

== Lineage ==
399th Bombardment Group

- Constituted as 399th Bombardment Group (Heavy) on 15 February 1943

Activated on 1 March 1943
Disbanded on 31 March 1944

- Reconstituted and consolidated with the 589th Tactical Missile Group as the 399th Tactical Missile Wing on 31 July 1985

399th Tactical Missile Wing

- Constituted as the 589th Tactical Missile Group on 9 November 1956

Activated on 8 March 1957
Inactivated on 8 June 1958

- Consolidated with the 399th Bombardment Group as the 399th Tactical Missile Wing on 31 July 1985

=== Assignments ===
- II Bomber Command, 1 March 1943
- Second Air Force, 6 October 1943
- IV Bomber Command, 3 December 1943 – 31 March 1944
- 4504 Tactical Missile Wing, 8 March 1957 – 8 June 1958

=== Components ===
- 24th Tactical Missile Squadron: 15 March 1957 – 25 April 1958
- 589th Support Squadron: 15 March 1957 – 8 June 1958
- 604th Bombardment Squadron: 1 March 1943 – 31 March 1944
- 605th Bombardment Squadron: 1 March 1943 – 31 March 1944
- 606th Bombardment Squadron: 1 March 1943 – 31 March 1944
- 607th Bombardment Squadron: 1 March 1943 – 31 March 1944

=== Stations ===
- Davis-Monthan Field, Arizona, 1 March 1943
- Gowen Field, Idaho 10 April 1943
- Wendover Field, Utah, 27 April 1943
- March Field, California, 3 December 1943 – 31 March 1944
- Orlando Air Force Base, Florida, 8 March 1957 – 8 June 1958

=== Aircraft and missiles ===
- Consolidated B-24 Liberator, 1943–1944
- Martin TM-61 Matador, 1957–1958
