= 488th Tactical Missile Wing =

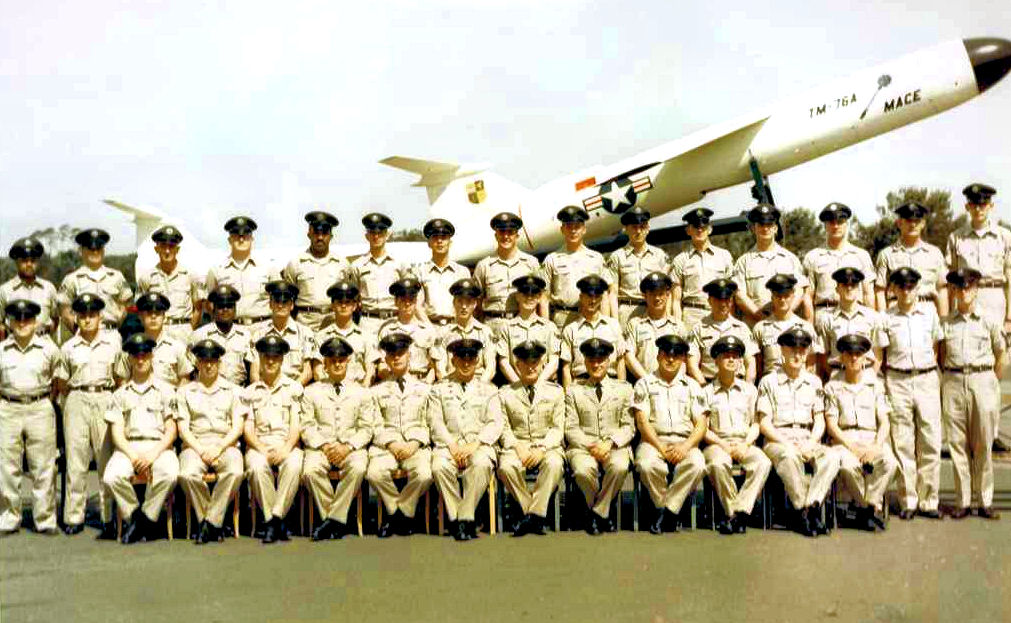
- Graduation photo of 17th Tactical Missile Squadron with TM-76 Mace Missile
- Active: 1943–1944; 1957-1958
- Country: United States
- Branch: United States Air Force
- Role: Bombardment and Tactical missile training
- Motto(s): Nullus Secundus (Latin for 'Second to None')

Commanders
- 588th Tactical Missile Group commander: Lt. Col. Bowers W. Espy.

Insignia
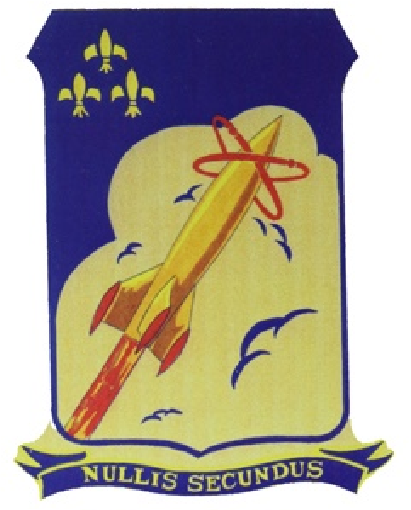
- 588 Tactical Missile Group emblem (Note: Approved 21 June 1957. Description: On a shield Azure, three fleurs-de-lis Or in dexter canton, one and two; a cloud formation rising from base to chief area of shield Argent, detail of the field; superimposed over the cloud a guided missile, in bend sinister, Or, shaded golden brown, highlighted yellow, a projectile on each tail fin Gules; fire exhaust trailing off in dexter base Gules and Or, two nuclear orbits encircling the warhead of the missile Gules. Significance: The cluster of fleur-de-lis is symbolic of the three squadrons which comprise the group. The two nuclear orbits about the warhead denote the nuclear capability of the guided missile. The guided missile is the combat operational weapon of the 588th Tactical Missile Group. The climbing attitude of the missile denotes its having been launched from the surface of the earth. Clouds as part of the background are symbolic of the guided missile operating at any altitude and in any kind of weather.)

The 488th Tactical Missile Wing is an inactive United States Air Force unit. It was formed by the consolidation of the 488th Bombardment Group and the 588th Tactical Missile Group in 1985, but has not been active since consolidation.

The 488th Bombardment Group was a United States Army Air Forces heavy bomber operational and replacement training unit that served during World War II. It was last assigned to Third Air Force at MacDill Field, Florida, where it was disbanded on 1 May 1944.

The 588th Tactical Missile Group was a United States Air Force tactical missile training unit that served during the Cold War. It was last assigned to 4504th Missile Training Wing at Orlando Air Force Base, Florida, where it was inactivated on 15 July 1958.

== History ==
=== World War II ===
The 488th Bombardment Group was activated at Geiger Field, Washington in the fall of 1943 with the 840th, 841st, 842d, and 843d Bombardment Squadrons assigned. While the 841st and 842d Squadrons were activated with group headquarters at Geiger, the 840th at Ephrata Army Air Field, Washington and the 843d at Kearney Army Air Field, Nebraska were former antisubmarine units. The group operated as a Boeing B-17 Flying Fortress operational training unit under Second Air Force. The OTU program involved the use of an oversized parent unit to provide cadres to "satellite groups." Toward the end of 1943 Second Air Force prepared to concentrate on Boeing B-29 Superfortress training and Geiger was transferred to Fourth Air Force and became a training base for Aviation Engineer units. The 488th headquarters and all its assigned squadrons were transferred to Third Air Force and moved to MacDill Field, Florida.

At MacDill the group operated as a B-17 replacement training unit. Replacement training units were oversized units which trained aircrews prior to their deployment to combat theaters. However, the Army Air Forces found that standard military units, based on relatively inflexible tables of organization were proving less well adapted to the training mission. Accordingly, a more functional system was adopted in which each base was organized into a separate numbered unit. This resulted in the 488th, along with other units at MacDill, being disbanded in the spring of 1944 and being replaced by the 317th AAF Base Unit, which assumed the group's mission, personnel, and equipment

=== Cold War ===
The 588th Tactical Missile Group was formed as a unit including launch, maintenance and support squadrons which could be deployed together rather than Tactical Air Command's previous practice of organizing independent missile squadrons. The 588th was part of the Ninth Air Force and its initial components were the 17th Tactical Missile Squadron, the 588th Communications and Guidance Squadron and the 588th Support Squadron. Initial training included preparation to deploy overseas. However, the 17th Squadron deployed to Pacific Air Forces by itself in early 1958, where it became the nucleus for the 6214th Support Group at Tainan Air Station, Taiwan.

In April the 24th Tactical Missile Squadron was reassigned from the 589th Group to the 588th Group and plans began to deploy to Osan Air Base, South Korea. The 24th engaged in crew training at Orlando but never received any missiles. The squadron did, however, deploy to Cape Canaveral Air Force Station and launched TM-61 Matador missiles under the guidance of the 6555th Guided Missile Squadron. However, when the 588th's personnel deployed, the United States Air Force decided to redesignate two fighter units at Osan instead of replacing them with new missile units. Deploying personnel and equipment were reassigned to the 58th Fighter-Bomber Group which was reactivated as the 58th Tactical Missile Group; the 310th Tactical Fighter Squadron, which became the 310th Tactical Missile Squadron; or the newly activated 58th Support Squadron and 58th Communications and Guidance Squadron.

In July 1958 the 4504th Wing reorganized and the 588th was inactivated and replaced by the 4504th Tactical Missile Training Squadron and the 4504th Support Squadron, which absorbed its remaining personnel and equipment.

The 488th Bombardment Group and the 588th Tactical Missile Group were consolidated on 31 July 1985 as the 488th Tactical Missile Wing, but the consolidated unit has not been active.

== Lineage ==
488th Bombardment Group

- Constituted as 488th Bombardment Group (Heavy) on 14 September 1943

Activated on 1 October 1943
Disbanded on 1 May 1944

- Reconstituted on 31 July 1985 and consolidated with the 588th Tactical Missile Group as the 488th Tactical Missile Wing

588th Tactical Missile Group

- Constituted as the 588th Tactical Missile Group

Activated on 8 January 1957
Inactivated on 15 July 1958

- Consolidated with the 588th Tactical Missile Group on 31 July 1985 as the 488th Tactical Missile Wing

=== Assignments ===
- II Bomber Command, 1 October 1943
- III Bomber Command, 1 November 1943 – 1 May 1944
- 4504th Missile Training Wing, 8 January 1957 – 15 July 1958

=== Components ===
- 840th Bombardment Squadron (later 818th Bombardment Squadron): 1 October 1943 – 1 May 1944 (Note: This squadron is not related to another 840th Bombardment Squadron (earlier 818th Bombardment Squadron). The two units swapped numbers on 15 February 1944. Maurer, Combat Squadrons, pp. 767-768, 777-778.)
- 841st Bombardment Squadron: 1 October 1943 – 1 May 1944
- 842d Bombardment Squadron: 1 October 1943 – 1 May 1944
- 843d Bombardment Squadron: 1 October 1943 – 1 May 1944
- 17th Tactical Missile Squadron, 8 January 1957 – 6 February 1958
- 24th Tactical Missile Squadron, 25 April 1958 – 15 July 1958
- 588th Communications and Guidance Squadron (Tactical Missile), 8 January 1957 – 15 July 1958
- 588th Support Squadron (Tactical Missile), 8 January 1957 – 15 July 1958

=== Stations ===
- Geiger Field, Washington, 1 October 1943
- MacDill Field, Florida, 1 November 1943 – 1 May 1944
- Orlando Air Force Base, Florida, 8 January 1957 - 15 July 1958

=== Aircraft and Missiles ===
- Boeing B-17 Flying Fortress, 1943-1944
- Martin TM-61 Matador, 1957-1958
