= 868th Tactical Missile Training Squadron =

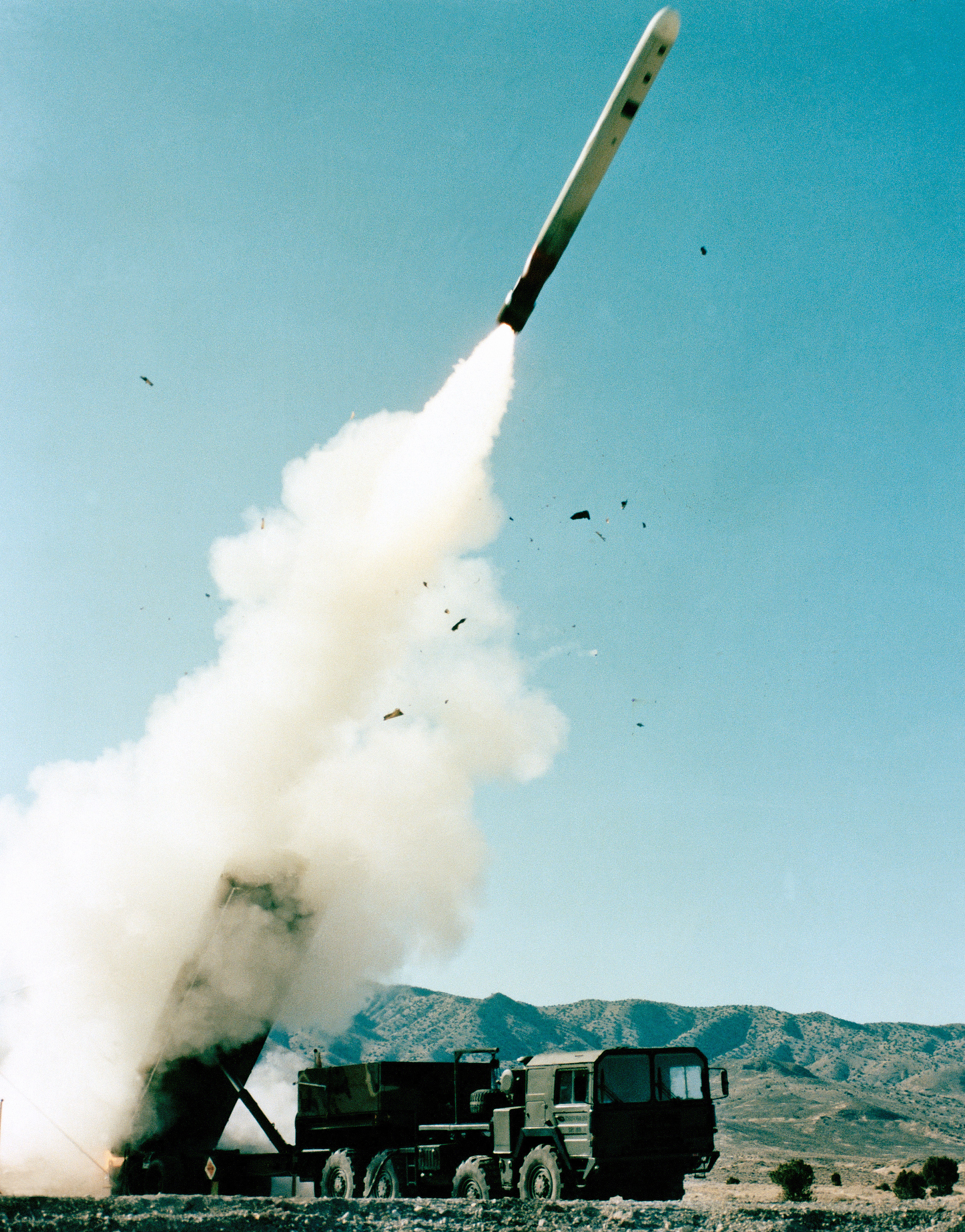
- Training launch of a BGM-109G Gryphon from its Transporter-Erector-Launcher at the Utah Test and Training Range in November 1982
- Active: 1943–1945; 1958–1962; 1981–1990
- Country: United States
- Branch: United States Air Force
- Type: Squadron
- Role: Cruise Missile Training
- Nickname: Snoopers (World War II)
- Motto: Missile Masters (1960–present)
- Engagements: Southwest Pacific Theater

- Decorations: Distinguished Unit Citation

Insignia
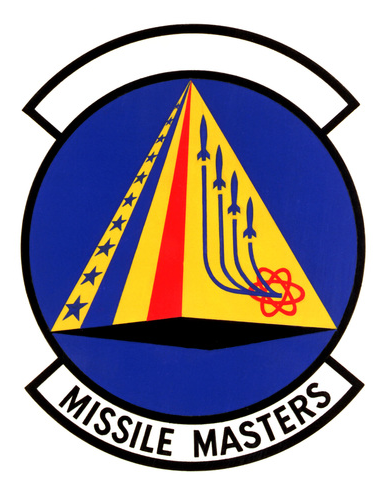
- 868th Tactical Missile Training Squadron emblem (Note: Approved 6 December 1982.)

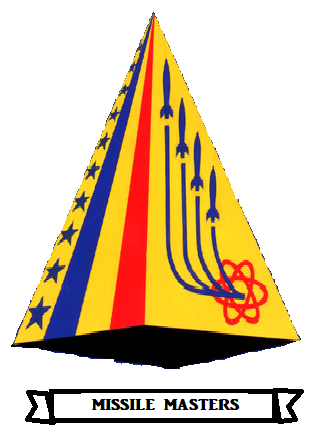
- 868th Tactical Missile Squadron emblem (Note: Approved 4 October 1960. Description: On a white dart-shaped area, its apex pointing upward, a black dart-like area issuing from base; three stripes issuing from the black area in dexter base, and diminishing to a vanishing point in chief, blue, white, and red, between, in dexter, nine Air Force blue stars diminishing in size to chief and having three guided missiles in flight to chief leaving trails, Air Force blue, in the center of an atomic symbol of three red orbits in sinister base. Significance (1982): The overall theme of the emblem is based on unity of the weapon system and the training mission of the squadron. The color forest green represents the mobility of the weapon system. The blue stripe and stars rising to the apex represent excellence in training. The red stripe rising to the apex and the red atomic symbol represent the capabilities of the weapon system.)

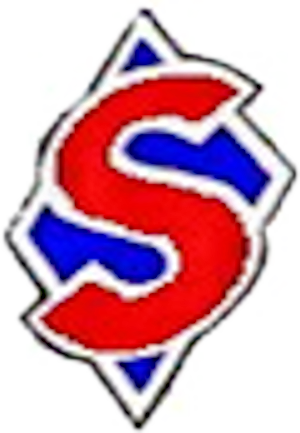
- Unofficial 868th Bombardment Squadron emblem (World War II)

The 868th Tactical Missile Training Squadron is an inactive unit of the United States Air Force. Its last assignment was with the 868th Tactical Missile Training Group, at Davis Monthan Air Force Base, Arizona, where it conducted training with the BGM-109G Gryphon. It was inactivated on 31 May 1990.

The squadron was first activated during World War II in the Southwest Pacific Theater as the 868th Bombardment Squadron, a specialized Consolidated B-24 Liberator unit conducting night raids on Japanese forces, earning a Distinguished Unit Citation. After V-J Day, the squadron returned to the United States for inactivation. It was activated again as the 868th Tactical Missile Squadron on Tainan, Taiwan in 1958 and operated Martin TM-61 Matador missiles there until again inactivating in 1962.

== History ==
=== World War II ===
==== Wright Project ====
Originally the Wright Project, a Consolidated B-24 Liberator bomber detachment supported by the 5th Bombardment Group in the Pacific Theater of World War II, the unit was equipped with radar equipped Liberators designated as the SB-24 search and attack bombers, or "Snoopers".

An extra crew member operated the SCR-717 10 cm radar; the SCR-729 aircraft radar beacon and a number of other specialized devices. The mission of the squadron was to conduct low level, anti-shipping strikes under the cover of darkness. They had this capability because the radar-sighting devices permitted operation of the bomb-release mechanism irrespective of visual sighting of the target.

The Wright Project flew its special radar-equipped SB-24 Snoopers nightly from 8 to 27 August 1943 on 1900 mile round trips from Los Negros Island to bomb Palau. By 23 August, Wakde Island was operational and the 5th and 307th Bombardment Groups started daylight B-24 missions over Palau. Between 25 August and 4 September, nine missions dropped over 600 tons of bombs. Major damage occurred throughout Palau, but at a cost: seven B-24's did not return. An enemy fighter shot down one and antiaircraft artillery shot down at least three others over Babeldaob and adjacent Koror; these four were reported to have crashed within sight of the islands. Parachutes from two B-24's were seen by wingmen and at least two crew members were later recorded as captured. The remaining B-24's fell into deep water outside the Palau Islands. In a late 1943 report of the Wright Project accomplishments, one recommendation was to form an independent squadron. This was in great part because radar maintenance drew heavily on normal ground personnel of the host unit.

==== 868th Bombardment Squadron ====
The 868th Bombardment Squadron was activated on 1 January 1944 and assigned directly to Headquarters, Thirteenth Air Force. It continued SB-24 continued operations in 1944. By March 1944, the Japanese ceased sending shipping convoys to the Solomon Islands area and the squadron was out of a job and were subsequently used as pathfinders for high-altitude bombers. Special missions were flown against land targets at night and one of the intentions was to prevent the Japanese from sleeping just as the Japanese “Washing Machine Charlie” did against the United States Marines on Guadalcanal.

They participated in the destruction of Truk in April 1944. In August 1944 they conducted nightly 1100 mile two-plane attacks from Los Negroes to the Palaus in the Netherlands East Indies. Ten B-24 Snoopers of the 868th struck Soerabaja, Java, on 7 May, flying a total distance of 2660 statute miles, in 17 hours and 40 minutes, one of the longest flights ever made by B-24 aircraft in combat formation. Seven "Snoopers" shattered their own record soon after by flying a strike against Batavia, Java, 3 June 1945; they flew in formation from Palawan to Batavia and return to cover a distance of 3000 statute miles, in 18 hours and 40 minutes. A measure of success was achieved in both strikes against Java; in each case, the Japanese were taken by surprise and shipping in the harbors was left either sunk or damaged.

From October 1944 through V-J Day, the Snoopers accounted for 119 ships totaling more than 62,000 tons sunk, 31 ships totaling 38,000 tons probably sunk, and 322 ships totaling 110,000 tons damaged. This included a 600-foot, 13,000 ton aircraft carrier, probably sunk in March 1945. Starting 7 August 1945, the "Snoopers" were flying strikes from Yontan Airfield, Okinawa. They flew as far as Genzan in Korea and Japan's Kyushu Island. On 7 August 1945, the last "Snooper" to be lost in action also became the only American plane downed on Korean soil. The squadron returned to the United States in December 1945 and was inactivated at Fort Lewis, Washington the day after its arrival.

=== Matador missile unit ===
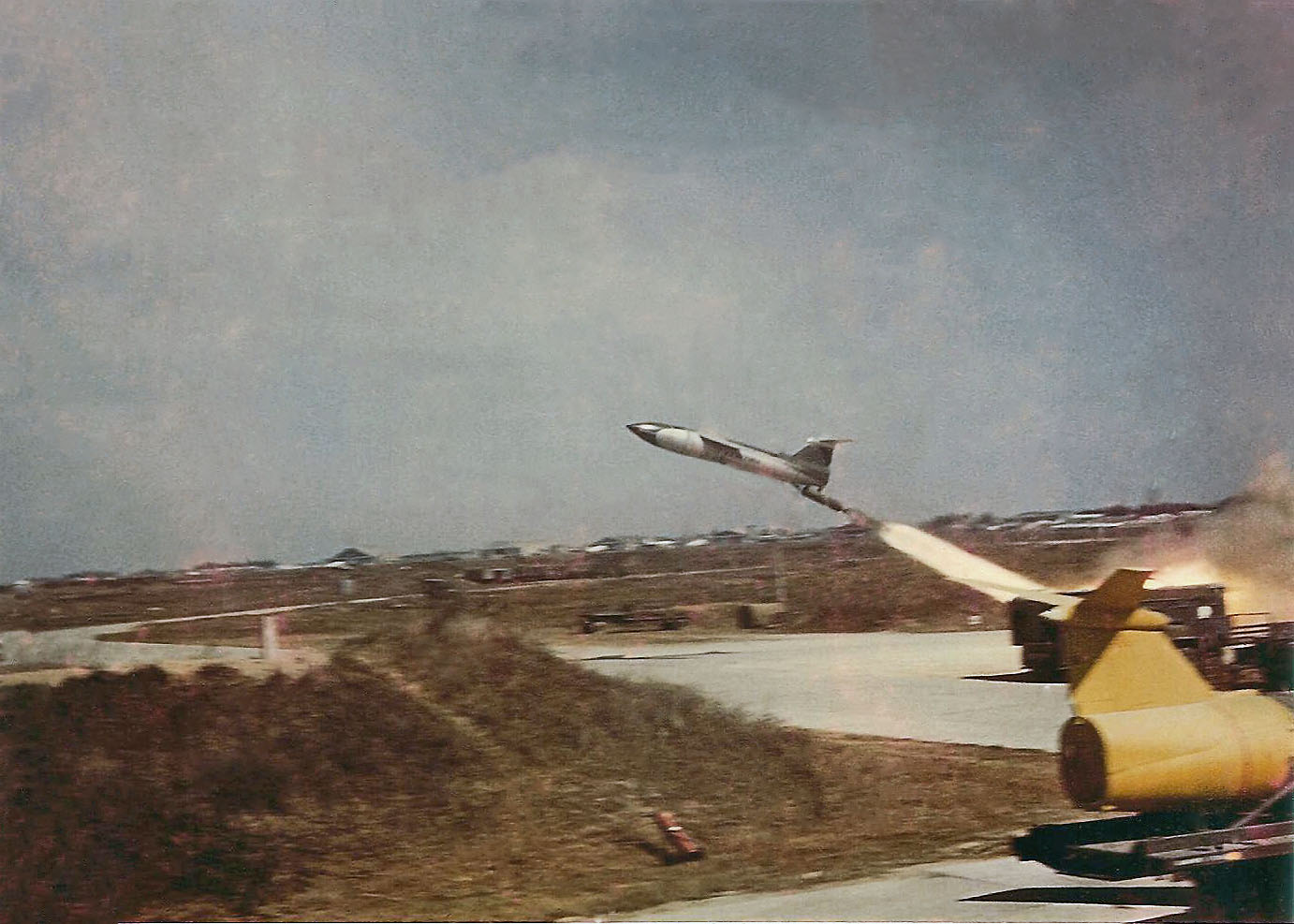
Squadron launch of a TM-61C missile at Tainan AB in 1959

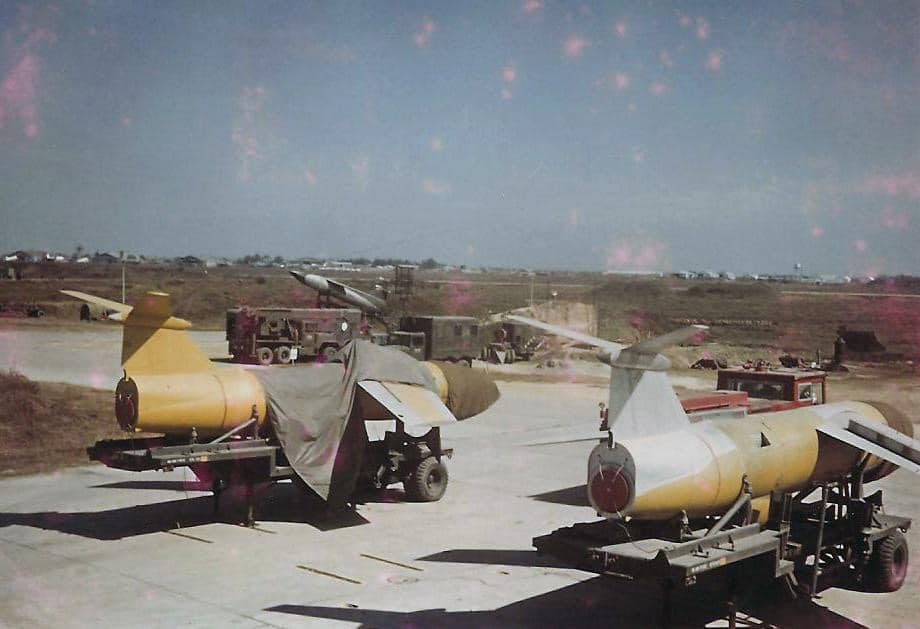
TM-61C Matador Missiles at Tainan Air Base, 1959

The squadron was redesignated the 868th Tactical Missile Squadron and activated on 8 July 1958, when it assumed the personnel, Martin TM-61 Matador missiles and mission of the 17th Tactical Missile Squadron, which was simultaneously inactivated. It was again assigned to Thirteenth Air Force. The 868th was attached to Air Task Force, 13, Provisional for operational control and further attached to Detachment 2 of the 6200th Air Base Wing, which was also known as the "Tainan Air Base Group" for administrative and logistical support. The support unit went through renumbering almost as often as the missile squadrons and on 18 August 1958, the detachment was replaced by the 6214th Air Base Group.

The squadron was assigned to Taiwan as part of their first Quick Strike commitment, and stood alert duty assigned to the Taiwan Straits. When the 498th Tactical Missile Group on Okinawa became operational with more capable TM-76B Mace missiles in 1962, the squadron's Matadors were no longer needed and the squadron was inactivated in March 1962.

=== Ground launched missile training unit ===
In July 1982, the squadron was redesignated the 868th Tactical Missile Training Squadron and became a training squadron for the BGM-109G Gryphon Ground Launched Cruise Missile.

During preparations to fire unmanned aerial vehicles into Iraqi air defenses in 1990–91, the group was utilized to assist in the launch of Northrop BQM-74 Chukars and Navy ADM-141 TALDs from King Khalid Air Base and Ar'ar into Iraq. Personnel under the direction of Colonel Douglas Livingston were dispatched to Saudi Arabia, as the group represented the little Air Force expertise that was available on ground-launched missiles.

Inactivated as a result of the Intermediate-Range Nuclear Forces Treaty in May 1990.

The training facilities of the 868th TMTG are now occupied by the 612th Air Operations Center.

== Lineage ==
- Constituted as the 868th Bombardment Squadron (Heavy) on 30 July 1943

Activated on 1 August 1943
Redesignated 868th Bombardment Squadron, Heavy c. 1944
Inactivated on 18 December 1945
Redesignated 868th Tactical Missile Squadron on 17 June 1958
Activated on 8 July 1958
Discontinued and inactivated on 25 March 1962

- Redesignated 868th Tactical Missile Training Squadron and activated on 1 July 1981

Inactivated on 31 May 1990

=== Assignments ===
- Thirteenth Air Force, 1 August 1943
- Far East Air Service Command, 8 October 1945
- Seventh Air Force, 29 October 1945
- VII Bomber Command, 1–18 December 1945
- Thirteenth Air Force, 8 July 1958
- 6214th Air Base Group (later 6214th Tactical Missile Group), 18 August 1958 – 25 March 1962
- Twelfth Air Force, 1 July 1981
- 868th Tactical Missile Training Group, 1 October 1985 – 31 May 1990

=== Stations ===
- Munda Airfield, New Georgia, Solomon Islands, 1 August 1943
- Momote Airfield, Los Negros, Admiralty Islands, 20 March 1944
- Kornasoren Airfield, Noemfoor, Schouten Islands, c. 29 August 1944
- Wama Airfield, Morotai, Netherlands East Indies, 22 March 1945
- Undetermined location, Leyte, Philippines, 3 July 1945
- Yontan Airfield, Okinawa, 29 July – 29 November 1945
- Fort Lewis, Washington, 17–18 December 1945
- Tainan Air Station, Taiwan, 8 July 1958 – 25 March 1962
- Davis Monthan Air Force Base, Arizona, 1 July 1981 – 31 May 1990

=== Aircraft and Missiles ===
- Consolidated B-24 Liberator, 1944–1945
- Martin TM-61 Matador, 1958–1962
- General Dynamics BGM-109G Gryphon, 1981–1990

== See also ==
- List of United States Air Force missile squadrons
