= 17th Training Squadron =

17th Training Squadron

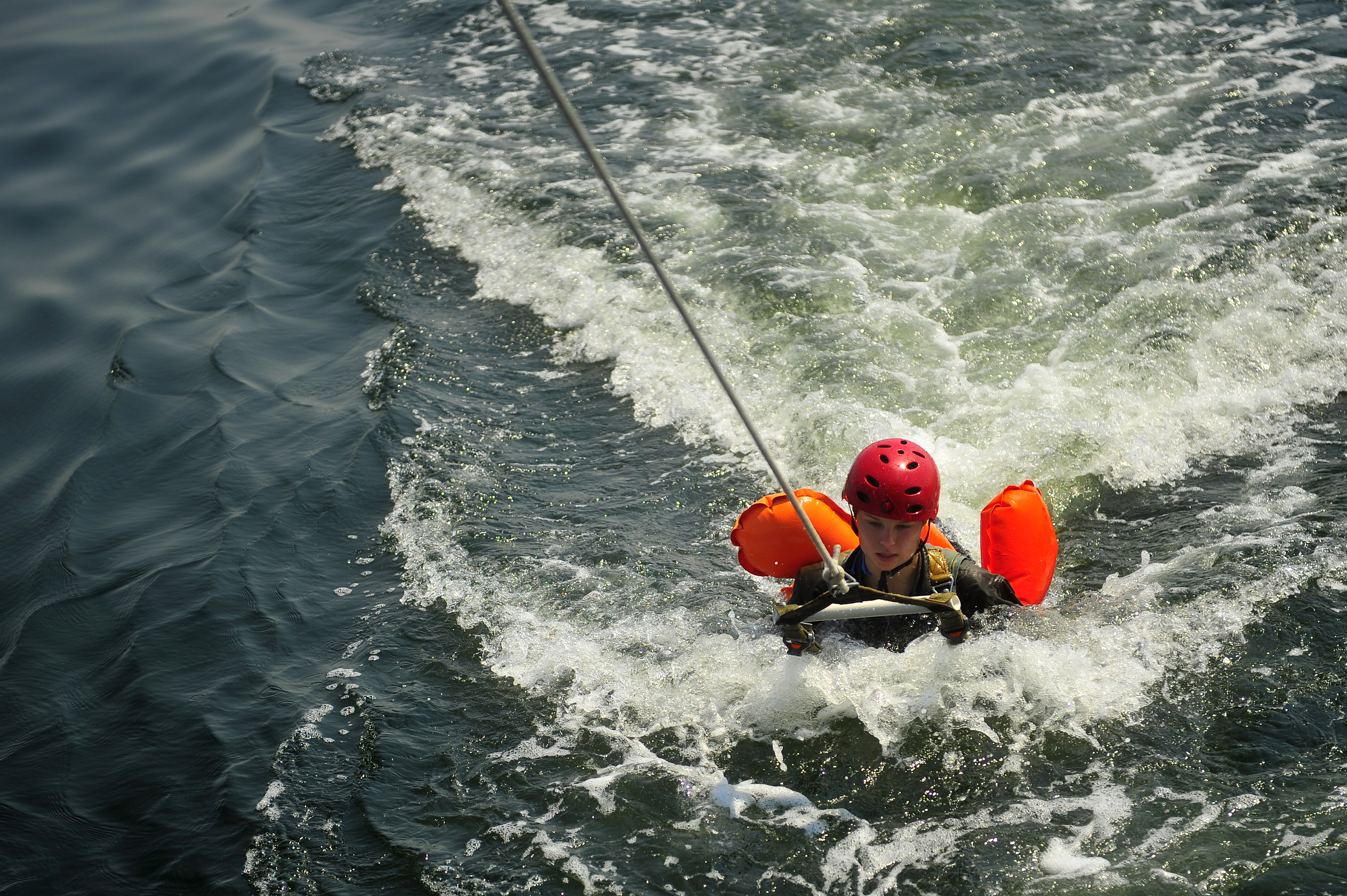
- An airman during the water survival course at NAS Pensacola
- Active: 1944–1946; 1955–1958; 1971–1997
- Country: United States
- Branch: United States Air Force
- Role: Water survival training
- Part of: Air Education and Training Command
- Engagements: Pacific Theater of World War II
- Decorations: Distinguished Unit Citation; Air Force Outstanding Unit Award

Insignia
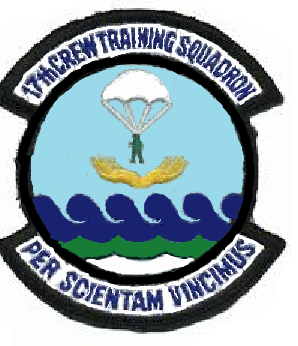
- 17th Training Squadron emblem

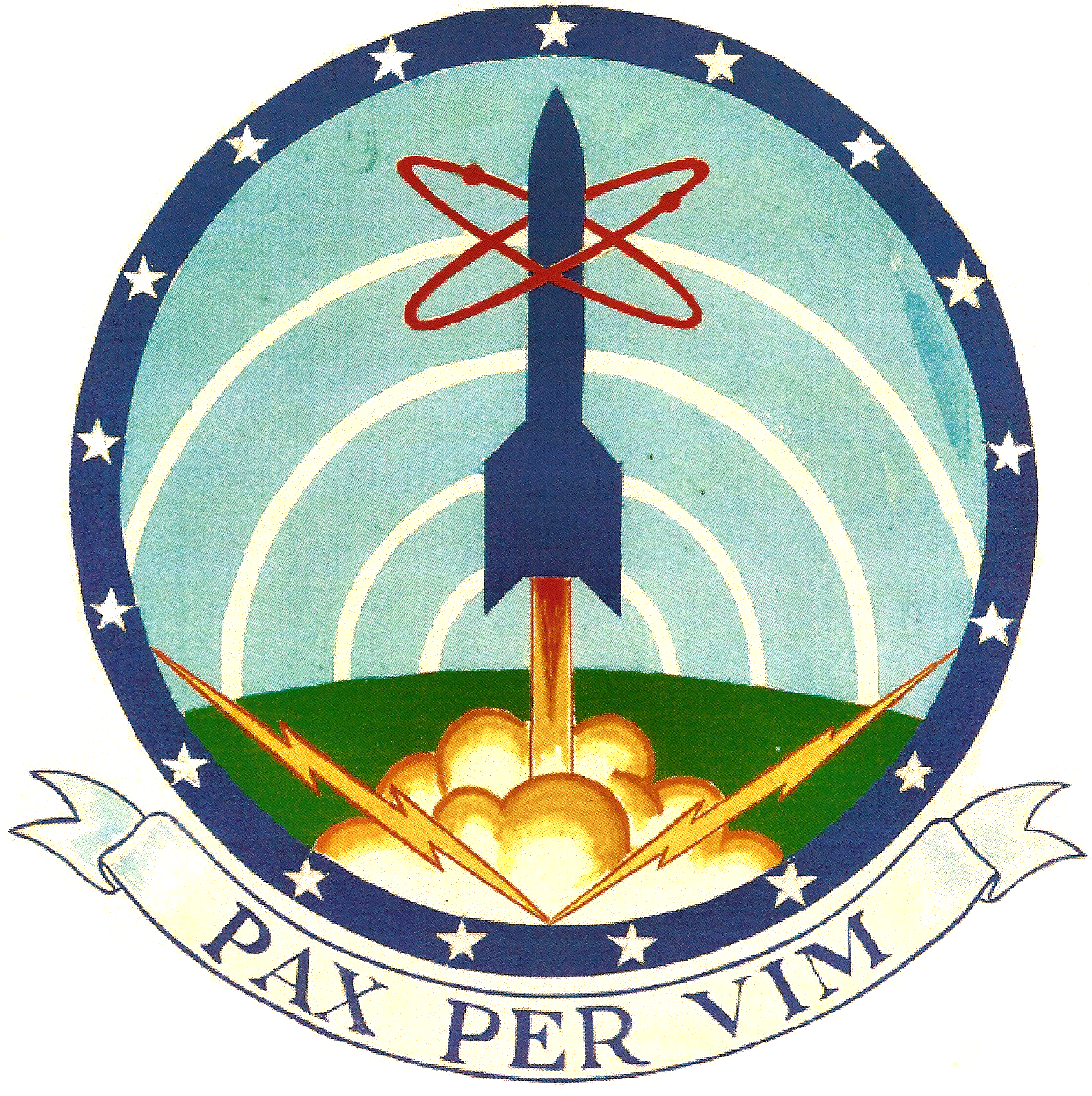
- 17th Tactical Missile Squadron emblem

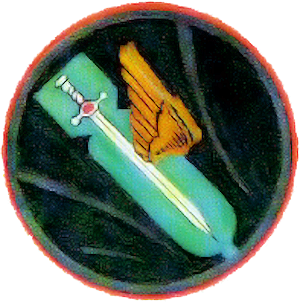
- 17th Bombardment Squadron emblem (approved 30 June 1945)

The 17th Training Squadron is an inactive United States Air Force unit. The squadron performed water survival training in Florida from 1971 until it was inactivated in 1997.

The first predecessor of the squadron was the 17th Bombardment Squadron, a Boeing B-29 Superfortress unit that participated in the strategic bombing of Japan during World War II, earning a Distinguished Unit Citation for raids in late July and early August 1945. The squadron was inactivated after the end of the war.

The second predecessor of the squadron was the 17th Tactical Missile Squadron, a Martin B-61 Matador squadron that stood alert with its weapons on Taiwan from 1957 until July 1958, when it transferred its resources to another squadron. These two units were consolidated in 1985 and in 1993, they were consolidated with the 3613th Combat Crew Training Squadron, which had been conducting water survival training at Homestead Air Force Base as the 17th Crew Training Squadron.

== History ==
Activated 1 April 1944 at Dalhart Army Airfield, Texas. Initially equipped with B-17 Flying Fortresses for training, due to shortage of B-29 Superfortresses. Moved to Fairmont Army Airfield, Kansas, in August 1944 and equipped with B-29B limited production aircraft.

After completion of training deployed to Central Pacific Area (CPA), assigned to XXI Bomber Command, Northwest Field (Guam) for operational missions. B-29Bs were standard production aircraft stripped of most defensive guns to increase speed and bomb load, The tail gun was aimed and fired automatically by the new AN/APG-15B radar fire control system that detected the approaching enemy plane and made all the necessary calculations.

Mission of the squadron was the strategic bombardment of the Japanese Home Islands. Entered combat on 16 June 1945 with a bombing raid against an airfield on Moen. Flew first mission against the Japanese home islands on 26 June 1945 and afterwards operated principally against the enemy's petroleum industry. Flew primarily low-level, fast attacks at night using a mixture of high-explosive and incendiary bombs to attack targets.

Flew last combat mission on 15 August 1945, later flew in "Show of Force" mission on 2 September 1945 over Tokyo Bay during formal Japanese Surrender. Inactivated on Guam 15 April 1946, personnel returned to the United States and aircraft sent to storage in Southwest United States.

=== Tactical missiles ===
During the Cold War, became a MGM-1 Matador Tactical Missile squadron. Formed at Orlando AFB, Florida, as part of Ninth Air Force, Tactical Air Command in 1955. Trained in Florida until deployed to Pacific Air Forces Thirteenth Air Force. Lead elements of the squadron began deploying to Tainan Air Base, Taiwan, in May 1957 with conventional warheads on missiles, main squadron in November when W-5 warheads were available, and the official reassignment to PACAF on 1 February 1958.

The 17th was inactivated and transferred its mission, personnel and equipment to the 868th Tactical Missile Squadron in July 1958.

=== Water survival training ===
Prior to 1971, water survival training for combat aircrews was performed by various units in different commands. In that year it was centralized under Air Training Command, which formed the 3613th Combat Crew Training Squadron using the resources of the Tactical Air Command school located at Homestead Air Force Base, Florida. The squadron was assigned to the 3636th Combat Crew Training Group, located across the country at Fairchild Air Force Base, Washington. By 1993, the Air Force was doing away with Major Command controlled units (sometimes referred to as "4-digit" units and the squadron was combined with the 17th Tactical Missile Squadron as the 17th Crew Training Squadron.

In 1997 the Navy assumed responsibility for training aircrews of all services in advanced water survival and the squadron was inactivated.

=== Operations and decorations ===
- Combat Operations: Combat in Western Pacific, 16 Jun-14 Aug 1945
- Campaigns: Air Offensive; Japan; Eastern Mandates; Western Pacific.
- Decorations: Distinguished Unit Citation, Japan 6-13 Jul 1945

== Lineage ==
17th Bombardment Squadron

- Constituted as the 17th Bombardment Squadron, Very Heavy on 28 March 1944

Activated on 1 April 1944
Inactivated on 15 April 1946

- Consolidated on 19 September 1985 with the 17th Tactical Missile Squadron as the 17th Tactical Missile Squadron

17th Tactical Missile Squadron

- Constituted as the 17th Tactical Missile Squadron on 4 May 1955

Activated on 8 September 1955
Inactivated on 8 Jul 1958

- Consolidated 19 Sep 1985 with the 17th Bombardment Squadron
- Consolidated 1 January 1993 with the 3613th Combat Crew Training Squadron as the 17th Crew Training Squadron

17th Training Squadron

- Designated as the 3613th Combat Crew Training Squadron and organized on 27 June 1971

Consolidated with the 17th Tactical Missile Squadron as the 17th Crew Training Squadron on 1 January 1993
Redesignated 17th Training Squadron on 1 July 1994
Inactivated on 2 January 1997

=== Assignments ===
- 16th Bombardment Group, 1 April 1944 – 15 April 1946
- Ninth Air Force, 8 September 1955
- 588th Tactical Missile Group, 8 January 1957
- Thirteenth Air Force, 1 February 1958–8 July 1958
- 3636th Combat Crew Training Group (later 336th Crew Training Group, 336th Training Group), 27 June 1971 – 2 January 1997

=== Stations ===
- Dalhart Army Airfield, Texas, 1 April 1944
- Fairmont Army Airfield, Nebraska, 15 August 1944 – 7 March 1945
- Northwest Field (Guam), Marianna Islands, 14 April 1945 – 15 April 1946
- Orlando Air Force Base, Florida 8 September 1955
- Tainan Air Station, 2 February 1957 – 8 July 1958
- Homestead Air Force Base, Florida, 27 June 1971
- Naval Air Station Pensacola, 1 June 1994 – 2 January 1997

=== Aircraft ===
- B-17 Flying Fortress, 1944
- B-29B Superfortress, 1944–1946
- Martin B-61 Matador, 1955-1958
