= 43rd Tactical Missile Squadron =

43d Tactical Missile Squadron
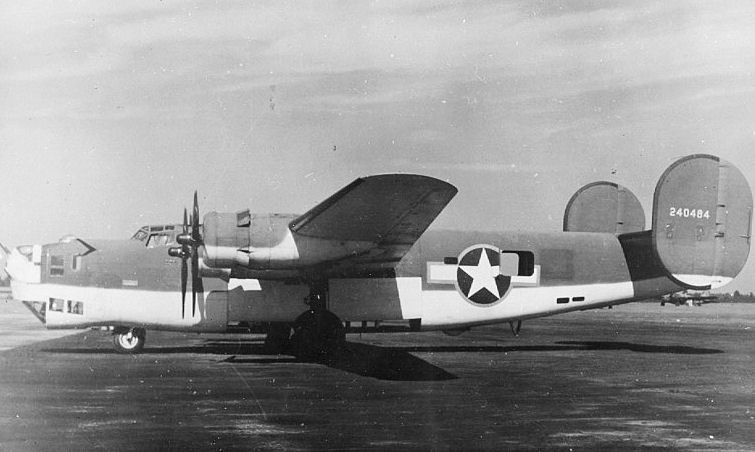
- A B-24 Liberator of AAF Antisubmarine Command, as flown by the squadron
- Active: 1943–1944; 1952–1954
- Country: United States
- Branch: United States Air Force
- Role: Antisubmarine warfare Tactical missile
- Engagements: Antisubmarine Campaign

The 43d Tactical Missile Squadron is an inactive United States Air Force unit, formed in 1985 by the consolidation of the 843d Bombardment Squadron and the 943d Forward Air Control Squadron. It has not been active under its current designation.

The 843d Bombardment Squadron was formed in May 1943 as the 24th Antisubmarine Squadron. It engaged in antisubmarine patrols through the summer of 1943 until the mission was turned over to the United States Navy. It then trained aircrews until it was disbanded in 1944.

The 943d Forward Air Control Squadron provided Tactical Air Control Parties in Germany from 1952 until its inactivation in 1954.

== History ==
=== World War II ===
The first predecessor of the squadron was activated in May 1943 as the 24th Antisubmarine Squadron at Westover Field, Massachusetts and assigned to the 25th Antisubmarine Wing, which was located in New York City, and was responsible for antisubmarine patrols off the Atlantic Coast. At Westover, the squadron was equipped with Consolidated B-24 Liberators equipped for antisubmarine warfare and conducted patrols off the Atlantic coast. However, in June the Army Air Forces agreed that "The Army is prepared to withdraw Army Air Forces from anti-submarine operations at such time as the Navy is ready to take over those duties completely." After the Navy assumed the mission in August, the squadron, along with the majority of Army Air Forces Antisubmarine Command's squadrons, was redesignated as a bombardment squadron and transferred to Second Air Force.

In the fall of 1943, the squadron moved to Kearney Army Air Field, Nebraska, and joined Second Air Force as the 843d Bombardment Squadron and began to transition from the Liberator to the B-17 Flying Fortress. A week later, it became part of the newly activated 488th Bombardment Group. Although group headquarters was located at Geiger Field, Washington, the squadron remained at Kearney. The group operated as a B-17 Operational Training Unit (OTU). The OTU program involved the use of an oversized parent unit to provide cadres to "satellite groups." Toward the end of 1943 Second Air Force prepared to concentrate on Boeing B-29 Superfortress training and Geiger was transferred to Fourth Air Force and became a training base for Aviation Engineer units. The 488th Group was transferred to Third Air Force and moved to MacDill Field, Florida along with the 843d Squadron.

At MacDill the squadron operated as a B-17 Replacement Training Unit. Replacement Training Units were oversized units which trained aircrews prior to their deployment to combat theaters. However, the Army Air Forces found that standard military units, based on relatively inflexible tables of organization were proving less well adapted to the training mission. Accordingly, it adopted a more functional system in which each base was organized into a separate numbered unit. This resulted in the 843d, along with other units at MacDill, being disbanded in the spring of 1944 and being replaced by the 316th AAF Base Unit, which assumed the squadron's mission, personnel, and equipment.

=== Cold War ===
The second predecessor of the squadron was the 943d Forward Air Control Squadron, which was activated at Kaiserslautern, Germany in November 1952. Its mission was to provide Twelfth Air Force with Tactical Air Control Parties to support Army units in Germany and operate communications systems connecting with the Joint Operations Center. The squadron participated in Joint Exercises with elements of Seventh Army until the squadron was inactivated in 1954.

In September 1985, the two squadrons were consolidated in inactive status as the 43d Tactical Missile Squadron.

== Lineage ==
843d Bombardment Squadron

- Constituted as the 24th Antisubmarine Squadron (Heavy) on 20 April 1943

Activated on 1 May 1943
Redesignated 843d Bombardment Squadron (Heavy) on 22 September 1943

- Disbanded on 1 May 1944
- Reconstituted on 19 September 1985 and consolidated with the 943d Forward Air Control Squadron as the 43d Tactical Missile Squadron

943d Forward Air Control Squadron

- Constituted as the 943d Forward Air Control Sq

Activated on 20 November 1952
Inactivated on 18 March 1954

- Consolidated with the 843d Bombardment Squadron as the 43d Tactical Missile Squadron on 19 September 1985

Consolidated Squadron

- Formed as the 43d Tactical Missile Squadron by the consolidation of the 843d Bombardment Squadron and the 943d Forward Air Control Squadron on 19 September 1985

=== Assignments ===
- 25th Antisubmarine Wing, 1 March 1943
- Second Air Force, 22 September 1943
- 488th Bombardment Group, 1 October 1943 – 1 May 1944
- Probably Twelfth Air Force, 1 March 1953 – 18 March 1954

=== Stations ===
- Westover Field, Massachusetts, 1 March 1943
- Kearney Army Air Field, Nebraska, 22 September 1943
- MacDill Field, Florida, c. 7 November 1943 – 1 May 1944
- Kaiserslautern, Germany, 20 November 1952
- Nellingen Kaserne, Germany 1 March 1953 – 18 March 1954

=== Aircraft ===
- Consolidated B-24 Liberator, 1943
- Boeing B-17 Flying Fortress, 1943–1944

=== Campaign ===
| Campaign Streamer | Campaign | Dates | Notes |
|---|---|---|---|
| | Antisubmarine | 1 May 1943 – 1 August 1943 | 24th Antisubmarine Squadron |

== See also ==
- B-24 Liberator units of the United States Army Air Forces
- B-17 Flying Fortress units of the United States Army Air Forces
