= 306th Air Refueling Squadron =

Inactive US Air Force unit

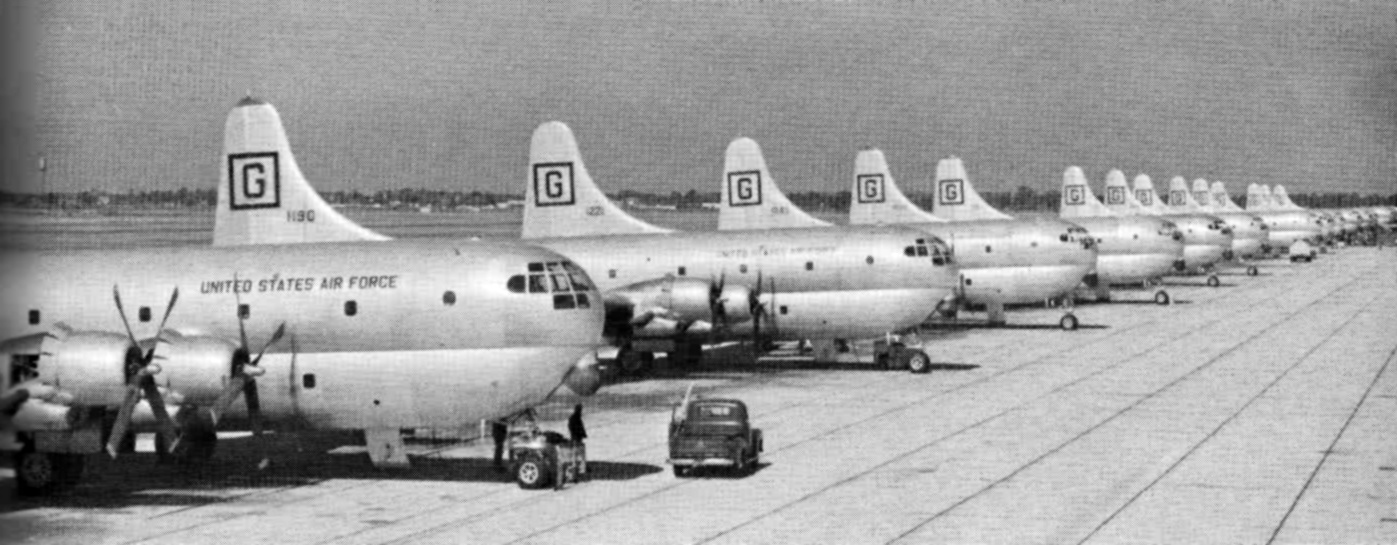
- 306th Air Refueling Squadron KC-97Es at MacDill AFB in July 1951.
- Active: 1943–1944; 1951–1973; 1984–1994
- Country: United States
- Branch: United States Air Force
- Role: Aerial refueling

Insignia
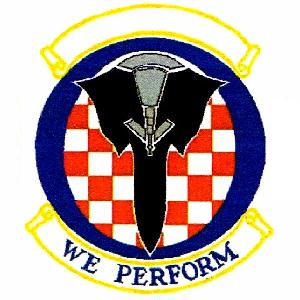
- 306th Air Refueling Squadron emblem

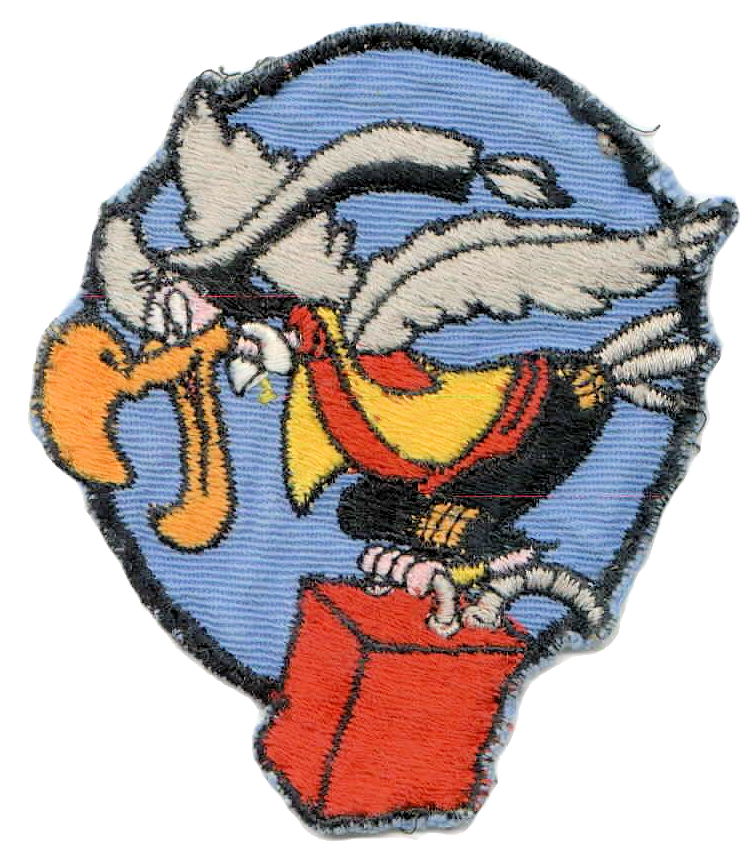
- 306th Air Refueling Squadron Patch (showing early emblem)

The 306th Air Refueling Squadron is an inactive United States Air Force unit. It was last assigned to the 457th Operations Group at Altus Air Force Base, Oklahoma, where it was inactivated on 1 August 1994.

The squadron's first predecessor is the 606th Bombardment Squadron, which was activated as a heavy bomber training unit during World War II. It was disbanded in 1944 when the Army Air Forces reorganized its training and support units in the United States to make more effective use of manpower.

The 306th Squadron was activated in 1951 and performed air refueling until it was inactivated in 1973. It was activated a second time in 1984. The two squadrons were consolidated into a single unit the following year.

== History ==
=== World War II ===
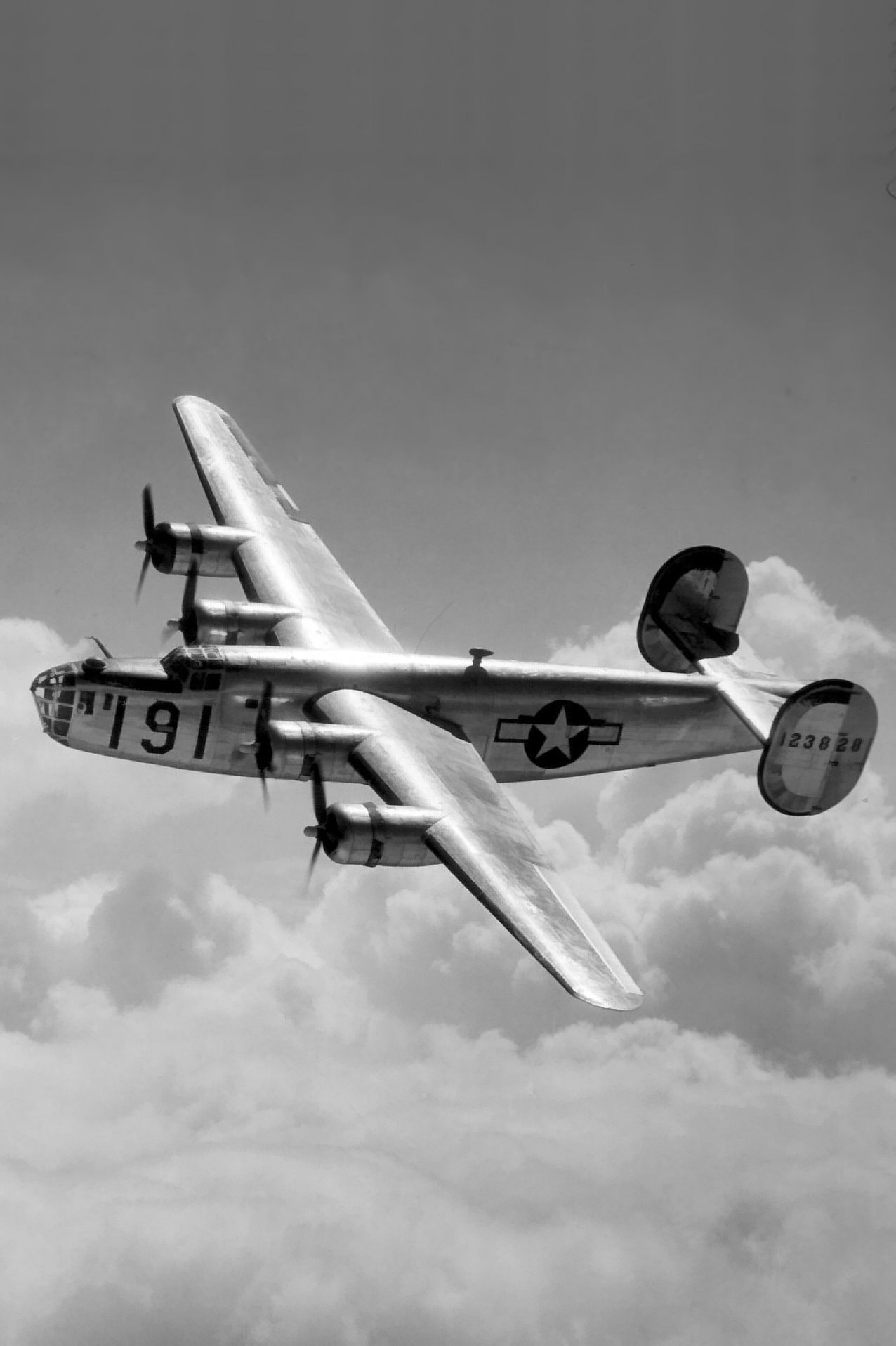
B-24 Liberator as flown by the 606th Squadron

The squadron's first predecessor was the 606th Bombardment Squadron, which was activated at Davis–Monthan Field, Arizona on 1 March 1943, but made two moves the following month, arriving at Wendover Field, Utah on 27 April. The squadron was one of the four original squadrons of the 399th Bombardment Group. At Wendover, it served as an Operational Training Unit (OTU) for Consolidated B-24 Liberator units until August. The OTU program involved the use of an oversized parent unit to provide cadres to "satellite groups"

The squadron became a Replacement Training Unit (RTU). Like OTUs, RTUs were oversize units, however their mission was to train individual pilots and aircrews. Following this mission change, the 399th Group and its components were reassigned from Second Air Force to Fourth Air Force, then moved to March Field, California in December.

However, the Army Air Forces was finding that standard military units like the 606th, which were assigned personnel and equipment based on relatively inflexible tables of organization were not proving well adapted to the training mission. Accordingly, it adopted a more functional system in which each base was organized into a separate numbered unit, which was manned and equipped based on the station's requirements. The 606th Squadron was disbanded, and along with operational and supporting units at March was used to form the 420th AAF Base Unit (Bombardment Replacement Training Unit-Heavy).

=== Air refueling ===
The squadron performed air refueling in support of USAF operations on a worldwide basis, flying the KC-97 and KC-135 Stratotanker.

== Lineage ==
606th Bombardment Squadron

- Constituted as the 606th Bombardment Squadron (Heavy) on 15 February 1943

Activated on 1 March 1943

- Disbanded on 31 March 1944
- Reconstituted on 19 September 1985 and consolidated with the 306th Air Refueling Squadron as the 306th Air Refueling Squadron

306th Air Refueling Squadron

- Constituted as the 306th Air Refueling Squadron, Medium on 17 August 1950

Activated on 1 September 1950
Redesignated 306th Air Refueling Squadron, Heavy on 1 July 1962
Inactivated 30 September 1973

- Activated on 1 October 1984
- Consolidated with the 606th Bombardment Squadron on 19 September 1985

Redesignated 306th Air Refueling Squadron on 1 September 1991
Inactivated on 1 August 1994

=== Assignments ===
- 399th Bombardment Group: 1 March 1943 – 31 Marcy 1944
- 306th Bombardment Group, 1 September 1950 (attached to 306th Bombardment Wing after 10 February 1951)
- 306th Bombardment Wing, 16 June 1952 (detached 8 November – 22 December 1954, 5 January – 21 February 1955, 20 December 1956 – 9 January 1957, c. 9–15 October 1957, 1 July – 5 October 1958, 5 April – 12 July 1961,
- 4047th Strategic Wing, 1 July 1962
- 306th Bombardment Wing, 1 April 1963 – 30 September 1973 (not operational after 1 September 1973)
- 340th Air Refueling Wing, 1 October 1984
- 340th Operations Group, 1 September 1991
- 457th Operations Group, 1 July 1993 – 1 October 1994

=== Stations ===
- Davis–Monthan Field, Arizona, 1 March 1943
- Gowen Field, Idaho, 10 April 1943
- Wendover Field, Utah, 27 April 1943
- March Field, California, ca. 1 December 1943 – 31 March 1944
- MacDill Air Force Base, Florida, 1 September 1950
- McCoy Air Force Base, Florida, 1 July 1962 – 30 September 1973
- Altus Air Force Base, Oklahoma, 1 October 1984 – 1 October 1994

=== Aircraft ===
- Consolidated B-24 Liberator, 1943–1944
- KC-97E Stratofreighter, Aug 1951 – 31 Jun 1962 (Also KC-97F/G)
- KC-135A Stratotanker, 1 July 1962 – 30 September 1973; 1 Oct 1984 – unknown
- KC-135Q Stratotanker, 1971 - 1973
- KC-135R Stratotanker, unknown – 1 October 1994
