= 4504th Missile Training Wing =

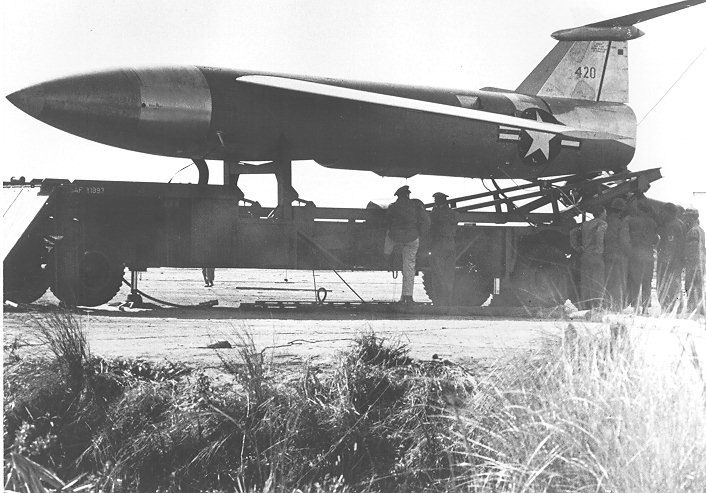
- B-61 Matador Missile used for training
- Active: 1954–1967
- Country: United States
- Branch: United States Air Force
- Role: Guided missile training

Insignia
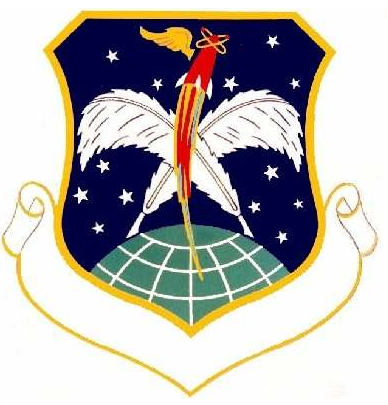
- 4504th Missile Training Wing emblem

The 4504th Missile Training Wing is an inactive United States Air Force unit. It was last assigned to Ninth Air Force, Tactical Air Command, stationed at Orlando Air Force Base, Florida. It was inactivated on 25 March 1967.

== History ==
The wing was a Tactical Air Command organization, with the mission to operate the USAF Tactical Missile School. Though its student squadrons trained Air Force personnel on the operation and maintenance of the MGM-1 Matador and MGM-13 Mace tactical cruise missiles, taking over the training mission from the Air Force Systems Command 6555th Test Wing at Patrick AFB, Florida on 18 October 1956.

The 588th Tactical Missile Group (TMG) was formed as a unit encompassing both launch and maintenance squadrons to be deployed together rather than single squadrons which had been done previously by TAC. The 588th TMG was assigned to Ninth Air Force and consisted of the 17th Tactical Missile Squadron (TMS) and the 588th Support Squadron (SUPRON). The 17th TMS was later deployed to Pacific Air Forces in 1958, being assigned to Tainan AS, Taiwan and being re-designated as the 858th TMS.

Ninth Air Force also formed the 589th TMG two months later in March 1957. The 589th included the 24th TMS and the 589th SUPRON. TAC also assigned a mobile training detachment to the school at Cape Canaveral AFS to assume crew training. The AFMC 6555th Guided Missiles Squadron assisted TAC with a training detachment in launching Matador missiles from the Cape.

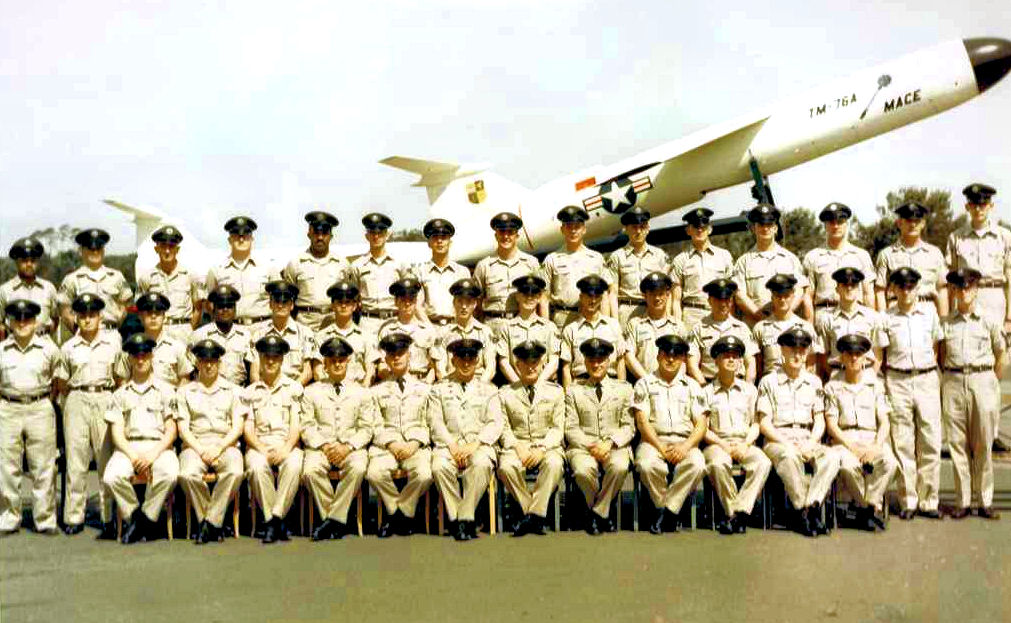
17th Tactical Missile Squadron – graduation, 1958

With the deployment of the 17th TMS to Taiwan, the 24th TMS was transferred to the 588th TMS on 25 April 1958. The 24th engaged in crew training at Orlando AFB but never received any missiles or deployment orders before the squadron was inactivated on 15 July 1958. The squadron did, however, deploy to Cape Canaveral AFS and launched for Matador missiles under the guidance of the 6555th Guided Missile Squadron.

With the inactivation of the squadron, personnel of the 24th TMS were reassigned directly to the 588th TMG. The 588th intended to deploy its lead elements to South Korea during the fall of 1958, but in a change of plans, the unit was in activated at Orlando AFB on 15 July 1958. The personnel and equipment of the 588th were reassigned to the newly formed 58th Tactical Missile Group at Osan AB, South Korea, with the newly re-designated 310th Tactical Fighter Squadron becoming the 310th Tactical Missile Squadron, absorbing the personnel of the 588th TMG en-masse.

In preparation for a new streamlined organization, both Tactical Missile Groups at Orlando AFB were inactivated within a few weeks of each other in mid-1958. The newly renamed Wing consisted of a Headquarters section, a Student Squadron, a Training Squadron and a Support Squadron. In addition the wing operated two geographically separated detachments, Detachment 1 at Holloman AFB, New Mexico for TM-76 Mace, and Detachment 2 at Cape Canaveral Auxiliary AFS, Florida (also known at "Camp Happiness") for TM-61C Matador (later TM-76 Mace) live firing of tactical missiles on the White Sands Missile Range or Eastern Missile Test Range.

Col Slayden established "Camp Happiness" as described in his memoirs: "The proficiency of the last squadron produced out of the school before I took command was not impressive--with a launch record of 13% on target. With a dramatic need to improve performance, I developed classroom and shop training at Orlando and launching activities at Cape Canaveral, in the latter instituting Camp Happiness. Launchings went from family vacations on Cocoa Beach (after nine-to-five workdays) paid in part by government per diem, to 24-hour days of military field exercises. A camp street near the launch site was bulldozed out of the scrub palmetto with tents, a latrine, and an icebox. It did not take long for the missile-on-target records of training squadrons to jump to 85%."

The school was affected by budget reductions in the early 1960s with the detachments inactivated and the organization reduced to one student squadron. By 1962, the school had graduated over 3,500 personnel The Tactical Missile School was closed on 25 March 1967 with the phaseout of the MGM-13 Mace missile out of the USAF innovatory, and the wing was inactivated. Instructors and all equipment was moved to Lowry AFB, Colorado, where Air Training Command was consolidating all USAF missile training.

=== Lineage ===
- Designated as the 4504th Missile Training Wing (Tactical) and organized on 1 September 1954
- Redesignated 4504th Tactical Missile Wing (Training) on 18 October 1956

Redesignated: 4504th Missile Training Wing (Tactical) on 1 July 1958
Redesignated: 4504th Combat Crew Training Wing (Tactical Missile) on 1 July 1959
Discontinued on 25 March 1967

=== Assignments ===
- Ninth Air Force, 18 October 1956 – 25 March 1967

=== Units ===
Groups

- 588th Tactical Missile Group, 8 January 1957 – 15 July 1958
- 589th Tactical Missile Group, 15 March 1957 – 8 June 1958 (Attached)

24th Tactical Missile Squadron, 15 March 1957 – 25 April 1958
589th Support Squadron, 15 March 1957 – 8 June 1958

Operational squadron

- 11th Pilotless Bomber Squadron (later 11th Tactical Missile Squadron), 1 September 1954 – 18 June 1958 (Attached)

Support units

- 4504th Missile Training Squadron (later 4504th Tactical Missile Training Squadron), 8 July 1958 – 19 December 1961
- 4504th Student Squadron (later 4504th School Squadron), 1 July 1960 – 25 March 1967
- 4504th Support Squadron, 8 June 1958 – 19 December 1961

=== Stations ===
- Orlando AFB, Florida, 18 October 1956 – 25 March 1967

Detachment 1, Holloman AFB, New Mexico, 8 June 1958 – 19 December 1961
Detachment 2, Cape Canaveral Auxiliary AFS, Florida, 8 June 1958 – 19 December 1961

== See also ==
- List of United States Air Force Tactical Missile Squadrons
