= MGM-13 Mace =

US tactical cruise missile

CGM/MGM-13 Mace
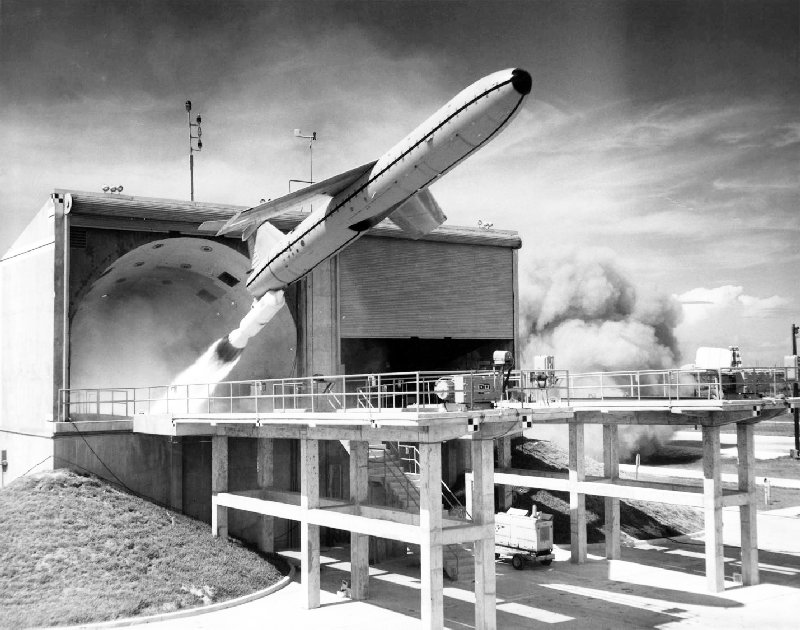
- CGM-13 test launch at Cape Canaveral
- Type: Cruise missile

Service history
- In service: 1959–1970
- Used by: United States Air Force

Production history
- Manufacturer: Glenn L. Martin Company
- Developed from: MGM-1 Matador
- Developed into: MGM-31 Pershing

Specifications
- Mass: 8500 kg (18,750 lb)
- Length: 13.6 m (44 ft 9 in)
- Diameter: 1.2 m
- Wingspan: 7.0 m (22 ft 11 in)
- Warhead: Nuclear W-28 (1.1 Mt yield)
- Engine: Allison J33-A-41
- Operational range: 1300 km (800 miles); TM-76B: 2400 km (1500 miles)
- Flight ceiling: 12200 m (40000 ft)
- Guidance system: Early Tercom

The Martin Mace was a ground-launched cruise missile developed from the earlier Martin TM-61 Matador. It used a new self-contained navigation system that eliminated the need to get updates from ground-based radio stations, and thereby allowed it to fly further beyond the front lines. To take advantage of this longer practical range, Mace was larger than Matador and could travel a longer total distance.

The original A model used a ground-mapping radar system which required the missile to fly at low to medium altitudes. In 1959 a new inertial navigation system was introduced that offered similar accuracy but had no altitude limitation. By flying at higher altitudes the missile's range almost doubled with no other changes. This led to the B model of 1961, which was limited to fixed launching sites, unlike the A model's mobile trailers.

Mace was replaced by the MGM-31 Pershing missile by then Secretary of Defence Robert McNamara, and later in its role as a cruise missile for West Germany, by the BGM-109G Ground Launched Cruise Missile.

Introduced during a period of changing nomenclature, they were originally designated TM-76A and TM-76B for "tactical missile" until 1963, then as MGM-13A for Mobile Ground-launched Missile and CGM-13 for Coffin Ground-launched Missile.

== History ==
=== Matador ===
The MGM-1 Matador was essentially an updated version of the V-1 flying bomb, replacing the V-1's pulsejet with a much more efficient turbojet engine. This allowed the missile to travel much longer distances. At the time, inertial navigation systems (INS) could not provide the desired 1 mile (1.6 km) accuracy at these longer distances, so Matador used a simple autopilot that was updated with corrections radioed to it from ground-based radar stations spread along its path. This system had the obvious disadvantage that it could only attack targets within a certain range of the ground-based stations; as the missile continued on its last path it would grow increasingly inaccurate. While this made it useful for attacks against targets near the front, like troop concentrations, it meant more important targets beyond the front, like airbases, might be too far to effectively attack. It also meant the system was subject to enemy jamming as well as more mundane issues with radio reception.

=== Mace A ===
In the early 1950s, Goodyear Aircraft Corporation began the development of the ATRAN (Automatic Terrain Recognition And Navigation) navigation system. This was based on taking photographs of a radar display at key points along the flight path of a radar-equipped aircraft. The photographs were automatically taken at timed intervals using a 35mm film movie camera. The film was then placed in the missile, which was equipped with the same radar system. At timed intervals, the movie would advance a frame while being moved horizontally across the radar display. At some point during the movement, the light output is maximized, indicating the position where the film most closely matches the display. The angle of the film at that instant indicates the direction the missile needs to turn to return to its pre-planned route.

ATRAN had the advantage that it was not subject to a maximum range or jamming issues, and in theory, could attack any target within range of the missile. It had the significant disadvantage that it could only attack pre-selected targets, unlike the radio system which would be directed at any target at any time. Any particular missile could be directed at a selected target by changing the film, but targets of opportunity could not be attacked unless they happened to lie along an existing path. Moreover, as the system compared the radar image to one made prior to flight, it was difficult to make maps much beyond the peacetime borders. This was later addressed by developing a method that used small models based on topographical maps to produce the films for any given flight, allowing the missile to follow paths that could not be pre-flown.

The ATRAN system was experimentally fit to a Matador beginning in August 1952. This led to a production contract in June 1954 for what was initially known as TM-61B Matador B. To take advantage of the potential range, Matador was modified with a longer fuselage to hold more fuel and modified the wings to be shorter. All-up weight increased to 18,750 pounds (8,500 kg) and range increased to 800 miles (1,300 km). To enhance mobility, Martin designed the Mace's wings to fold for transport, whereas the Matador's wings were transported separately and then bolted on for flight. Flight testing began in 1956, and the missile received its new name in early 1958.

USAF deployed the Mace "A" in West Germany in 1959 at Sembach Air Base, where it briefly served alongside the Matador before the latter was phased out of service in 1962. A total of 6 active missile squadrons were eventually equipped with the Mace "A" at Sembach Air Base and Hahn Air Base under the 38th Tactical Missile Wing. In South Korea, the 58th Tactical Missile Group became combat-ready with 60 TM-61s in January 1959. It ceased operations in March 1962, a few months after the 498th Tactical Missile Group in December 1961 took up positions in semi-hardened sites on Okinawa.

=== Mace B ===
Rapid development in guidance systems quickly rendered ATRAN obsolete. In 1959, a modified version replacing ATRAN with the AC Spark Plug AChiever INS was developed as TM-76B. A major advantage was that the ATRAN radar system scanned the horizon in front of the missile and thus had to fly at low altitudes in order to produce enough vertical relief. By moving to a pure INS, there was no longer any limitation on altitude and by flying higher the range increased to about 1,300 miles (2,100 km) with no other changes. The downside to the INS approach is that it requires an accurate survey of the launch point, so the system could no longer be mobile. This led to the B models being launched from hardened "coffin" launchers. The first TM-76B launch was on 11 July 1960.

Mace "B" missiles began were first deployed to Okinawa in 1961 and remained operational in Europe and the Pacific. The two squadrons of TM-76B/CGM-13C continued on active duty in USAFE until December 1969. After being taken offline, some missiles were used as target drones because their size and performance resembled crewed aircraft.

== Variants ==
YTM-61B Matador B
Development missiles. Redesignated YTM-76 Mace in 1958, and later MGM-13A Mace in 1963 (not to be confused with the 1964 MGM-13A).
QYTM-61B Matador B
Recoverable test vehicles. The "Q for drone" mission modifier before the "Y for test" status prefix was unusual, but appeared on official documents.
TM-76A Mace A
First production version, equipped with ATRAN terrain-matching radar navigation. Redesignated MGM-13B in 1963, and later MGM-13A in 1964.
TM-76B Mace B
Version with an inertial navigation system and increased range. Redesignated CGM-13C in 1963, and later CGM-13B in 1964.

== Locations ==
Mace A and B types have been deployed in Japan and former West-Germany

- Japan, Okinawa island: 873d Tactical Missile Squadron kept 32 Mace missiles on constant alert in underground bunkers at 4 Okinawa launch sites assigned to Kadena Airbase and located at Bolo Point in Yomitan, Onna Point, White Beach and at Kin just north of Camp Hansen.
- West Germany: 38th Tac Msl Wing kept 90 missiles on alert at above and underground launcher sites assigned to Sembach Airbase (sites at Mehlingen, Enkenbach and Grünstadt); to Hahn Airbase (sites at Wüscheim, Kirchberg and Hundheim) and to Bitburg Airbase (sites at Steinborn, Idenheim and Rittersdorf)

== Survivors ==
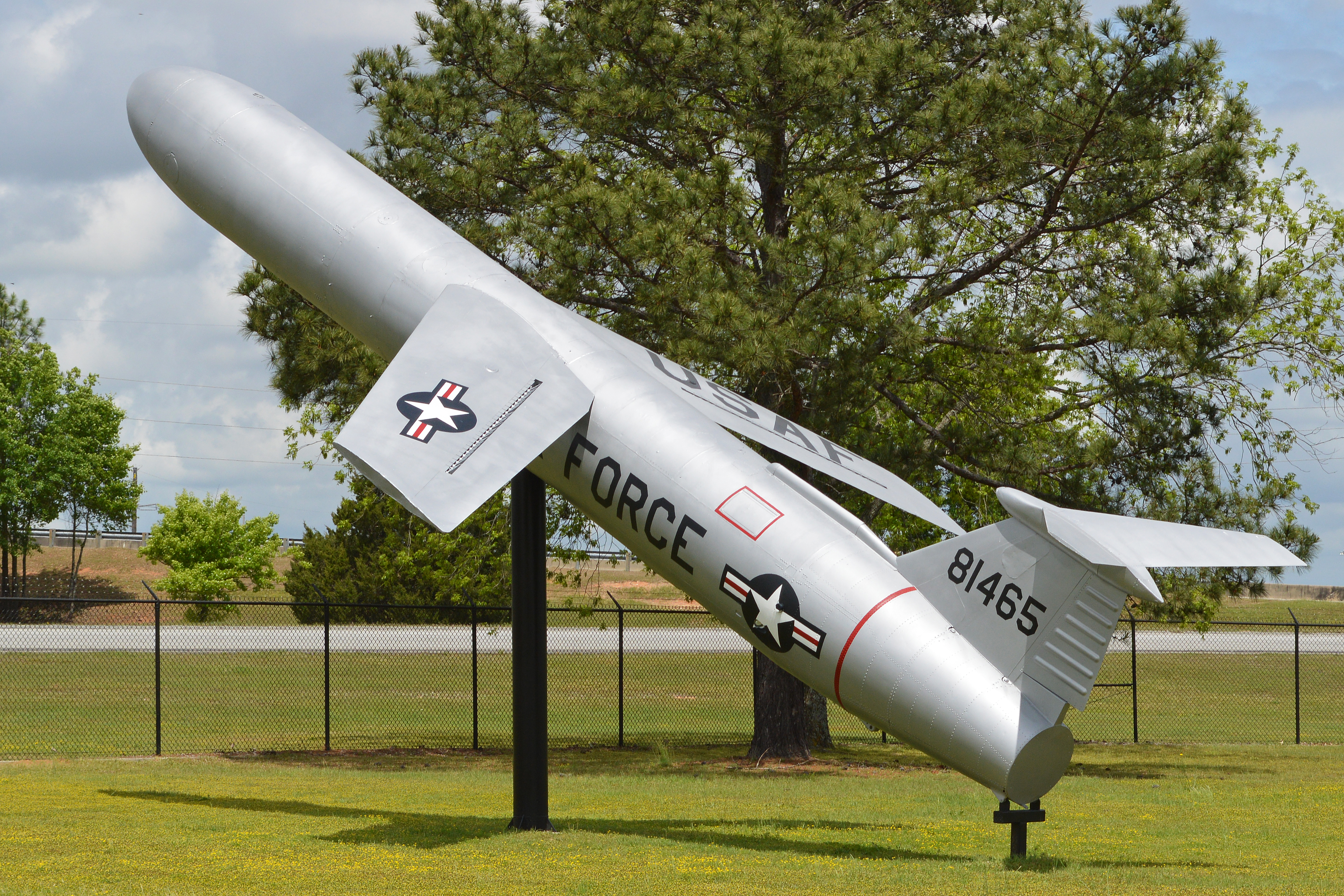
Mace at Warner Robins Museum of Aviation, Georgia

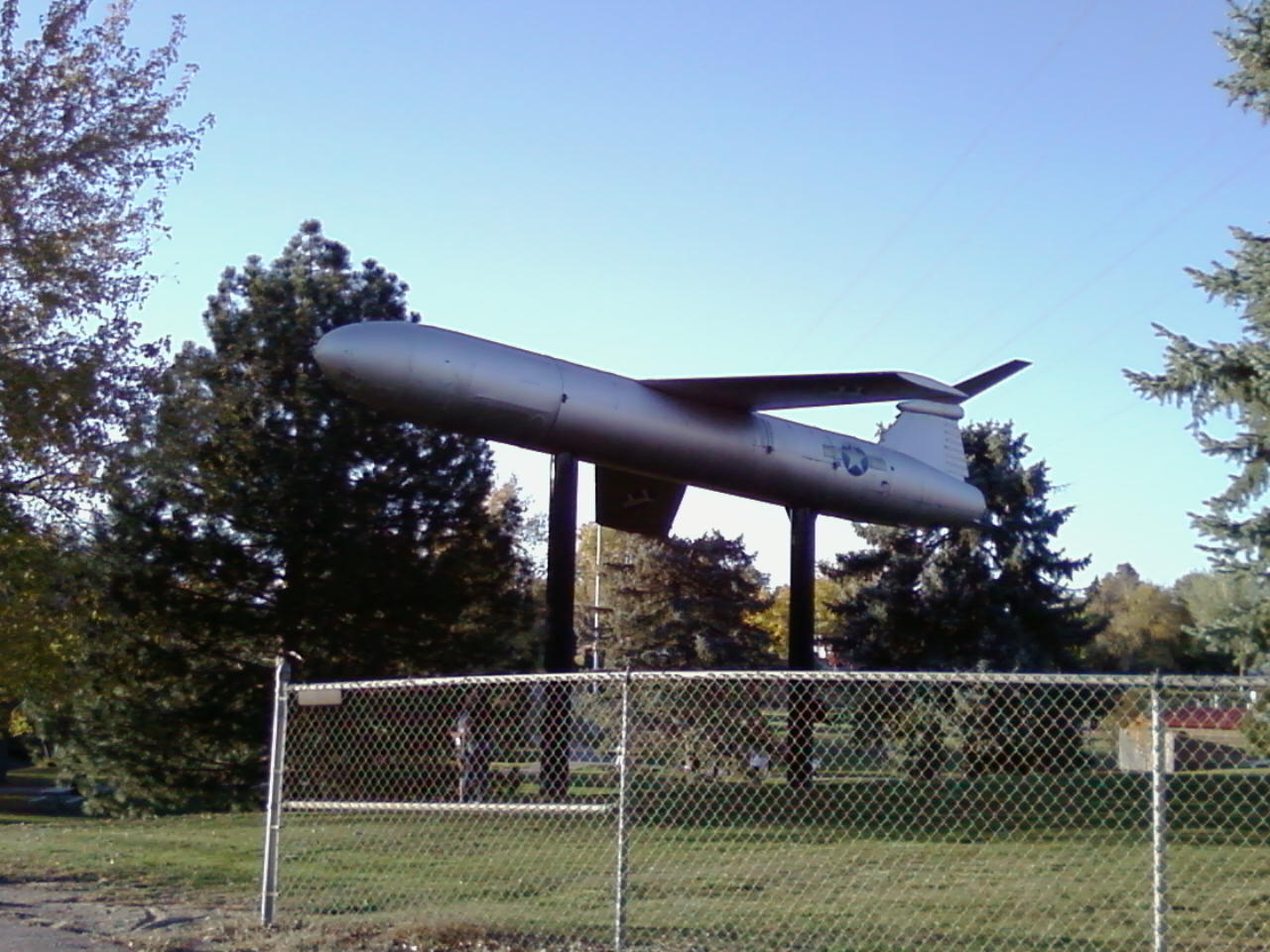
Mace at Belleview Park in Englewood, Colorado

Below is a list of locations which have a Mace missile in their collection or on display:

- Air Force Space & Missile Museum, Cape Canaveral Air Force Station, Florida. TM-76B / CGM-13B, AF Ser. No. 60-0715, but restored and marked as AF Ser. No. 59-4871. Originally assigned to the U.S. Air Force Tactical Missile School, 4504th Missile Training Wing, Orlando Air Force Base, Florida.
- Air Force Armament Museum, Eglin Air Force Base, Florida. CGM-13, AF Ser. No. 59-4860
- Museum of Aviation, Robins Air Force Base, Georgia. MGM-13A, AF Ser. No. 58-1465
- National Museum of the United States Air Force, Wright-Patterson Air Force Base, Dayton, Ohio. This Mace "B" was based on Okinawa prior to its delivery to the museum in 1971.
- Indiana Military Museum, Vincennes, Indiana. CGM-13B, AF Ser. No. 59-4871. This Mace B was assigned to the 4504th Missile Training Wing, Orlando AFB, Florida.
- Belleview Park, Englewood, Colorado. Elevated outdoor display. AF Serial Number is unknown. Donated to the city by the Martin Company in the 1960s for use as playground equipment.
- White Sands Missile Range Museum, New Mexico
- Flagler Memorial Park, Flagler, Colorado, Mace A elevated and fenced display. AF Ser. No. 58-1463.
- McDermott Post 452, American Legion, Mildred, Pennsylvania
- Ida County Veterans Memorial, Ida Grove, IA

== Specifications ==
General characteristics

- Length: 44 ft 6 in;13.6 m
- Diameter: 4 ft 6 in;1.4 m

Engine

- First stage: 1× Thiokol solid rocket booster;100,000 lbf,445 kN
  - Thrust:
- Second stage: 1× Allison J33-A-41 turbojet; 5,200 lbf (23 kN)
  - Thrust:

Technical information

- Launch platform:
  - MGM-13A: transporter erector launcher
  - CGM-13B: underground bunker

Performance

- Cruise speed: 650 mph (570 kn, 1,000 km/h)
- Operating altitude: 750 to 40,000 ft (230 to 12,000 m)
- Range: 1,400 mi (1,200 nmi, 2,300 km)

Warhead

- Warhead: W28 thermonuclear warhead

== See also ==
Related development

- MGM-1 Matador – (United States)

Related lists

- List of military aircraft of the United States
- List of missiles
