= MGM-1 Matador =

Surface-to-surface cruise missile

Martin MGM-1 Matador
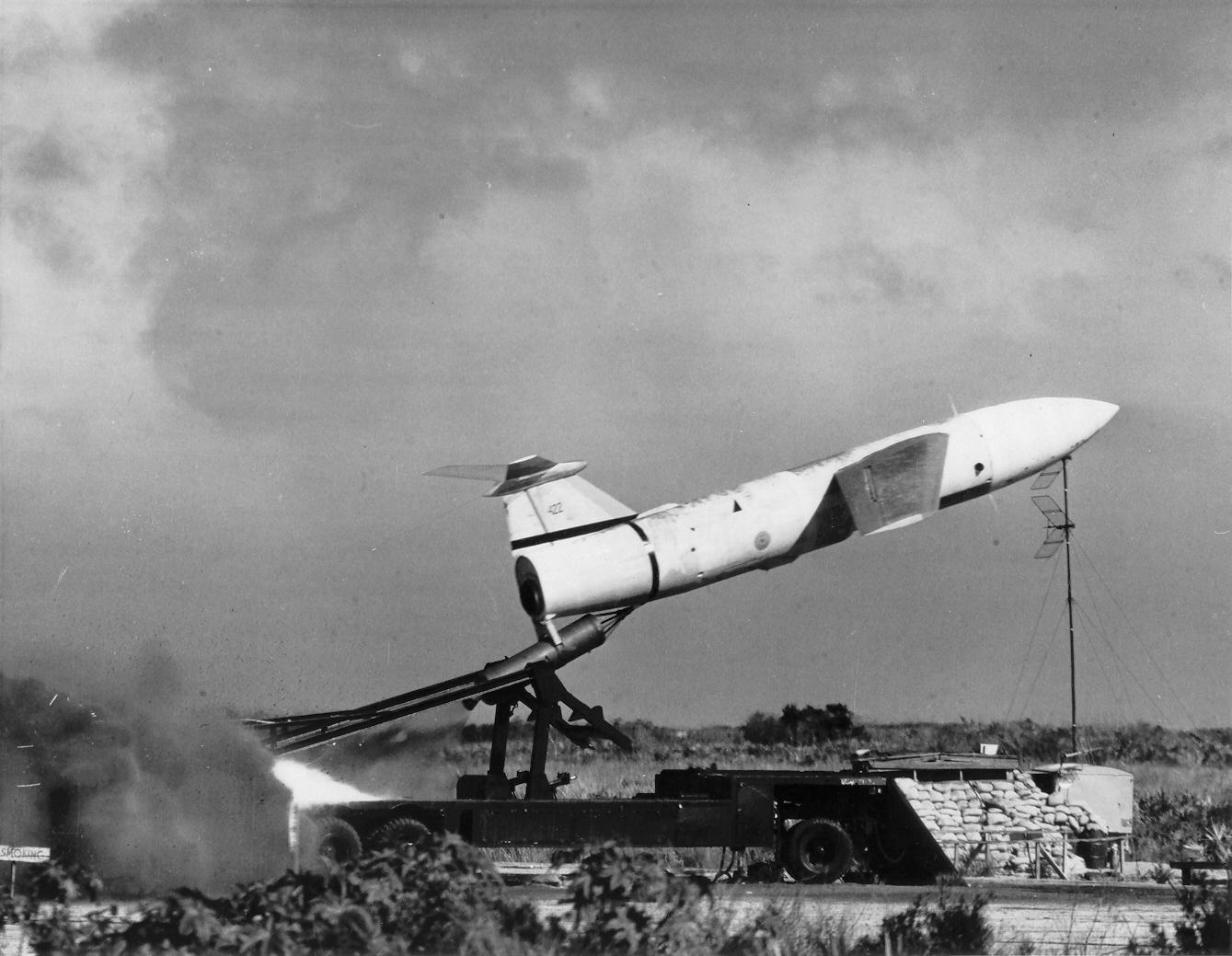
- Type: Surface-to-surface cruise missile
- Place of origin: United States

Service history
- In service: 1952–1962

Production history
- Designed: 1949 (first flight)
- Manufacturer: Glenn L. Martin Company
- Developed into: MGM-13 Mace
- No. built: 1,200

Specifications
- Mass: 12,000 lb (5,400 kg)
- Length: 39 ft 6 in (12.04 m)
- Diameter: 4 ft 6 in (1.37 m)
- Wingspan: 28 ft 7 in (8.71 m)
- Warhead: Nuclear W-5 (50 kt yield)
- Engine: 4,600 lbf (20 kN) thrust Allison J33-A-37 turbojet sustainer engine; 55,000 lbf (240 kN) thrust Aerojet General solid fuel rocket, 2 s burn
- Operational range: 250 mi (400 km) (TM-61A); 620 mi (1,000 km) (TM-61C)
- Flight altitude: 35,000–43,000 ft (11,000–13,000 m)
- Maximum speed: 650 mph (1,050 km/h; Mach 0.85) (supersonic terminal dive)
- Guidance system: "A" Radar directed radio command guidance system; "C" same plus Shanicle
- Accuracy: 2,700–1,600 ft (820–490 m) CEP
- Launch platform: Transporter erector launcher

The Martin MGM-1 Matador was the first operational surface-to-surface cruise missile designed and built by the United States. It was developed after World War II, drawing upon the US's wartime experience with creating the Republic-Ford JB-2, a copy of the German V-1. The Matador was similar in concept to the V-1, but it included a radio command that allowed in-flight course corrections. This allowed accuracy to be maintained over greatly extended ranges of about 600 miles (1,000 km). To allow these ranges, the Matador was powered by a small turbojet engine in place of the V-1's much less efficient pulsejet.

The Matador was armed with the W5 nuclear warhead, essentially an improved version of the Fat Man design that was lighter and had a smaller cross section. A single U.S. Air Force group, 1st Pilotless Bomber Squadron, was armed with the weapon, keeping them on alert with a six-minute launch time. It could be easily retargeted, unlike weapons using inertial guidance systems. Accuracy at maximum range was about 1 mile (1.6 km), which allowed it to be used against any large target like troop concentrations or armored spearheads.

First flown in 1949, Matador entered service in 1952 and left service in 1962. Matador carried several designations during its lifetime, originally known under the War Department's system as SSM-A-1. By the time it was introduced to service, the Air Force had been created, and they referred to them as bombers and assigned it the B-61 designation. It was later re-designated TM-61, for "tactical missile", and finally MGM-1 when the U.S. Department of Defense introduced the tri-service rocket and guided missile designation system in 1963.

== History ==
The first flight of Matador, model XSSM-A-1, occurred at the White Sands Missile Range on 20 January 1949. The first two production B-61 Matador missiles arrived at Eglin AFB, Florida, in September 1953, becoming operational, and the missiles were under the control of the 6555th Guided Missile Squadron, for climatic testing, although instrumentation and pre-test check-outs kept the actual cold-weather tests from the beginning until November. At the end of 1953 the first squadron was operational, but not deployed until 1954, as the 1st Pilotless Bomber Squadron, Bitburg Air Base, Germany with the B-61A armed with the W5 nuclear warhead. The missile was capable of carrying a 2,000 lb (910 kg) conventional warhead, but it is unknown if any of these were actually deployed. By the late 1950s at least, all Matadors carried the nuclear warhead.

Glenn L. Martin Company, the designer and manufacturer of both the Matador and the tri-jet Martin XB-51, proposed using the XB-51 in order to carry two of the Matador winged missiles, one on each wingtip, "selling two products at one time."

The XB-51 was instead turned down and the U.S. Air Force decided to go with the Martin B-57 Canberra, a licensed version of the British English Electric Canberra.

=== Retirement ===
The last Matadors were removed from active service in 1962, with a total of 1200 missiles produced. At that time, they were deployed in squadrons at Bitburg AB, West Germany, in Tainan, Taiwan, and in various locations in South Korea. The specific maintenance training schools were in at the Glenn L. Martin factory and Lowry AFB, both in Denver Colorado, while the launch training was at Orlando Air Force Base, Florida (later transferred to the U.S. Navy and renamed Naval Training Center Orlando) and Cape Canaveral Air Force Station, Florida. When the Tainan squadrons were inactivated, the airframes were made unflyable by chopping out the attachment points in the bulkheads of the fuselage sections with axes, and were sold locally as scrap after having the warheads removed. Most of the support vehicles, consisting mainly of 2½ and 5-ton trucks, were disposed of on the local market. Presumably, the other sites similarly disposed of their missiles and equipment.

== Guidance ==
The system was initially designed to use the SHANICLE (Short Range Navigation Vehicle) guidance system. This was essentially an adaptation of the LORAN hyperbolic navigation system to microwave frequencies to make it smaller and more accurate. A total of four stations were required per missile; two were used to produce a signal defining a line passing over the target, and a second pair defined the range. The missile's transponders rebroadcast these signals where they were picked up by receivers as the "master" station. The difference between the reception of the signals from any given pair indicated how far the missile was from the desired measure - a delay of zero meant it was exactly on course. The difference was calculated and the required updates were periodically sent to the missile's autopilot.

In December 1950 a new system was introduced, MARC. This was an adaptation of the AN/MSQ-1 used during the Korean War to provide ground-directed bombing. Instead of sending back a signal broadcast across the entire area, MARC used modified war-era SCR-584 radar sets to directly track the missile, which mounted an AN/APS-11 transponder to reflect the signals back to the station. These signals directly measured the range to the aircraft, unlike SHANICLE's measurements which were relative values. An analog computer then calculated the difference between the missile's current position and desired flight path, and sent signals to the autopilot encoded in the radar signals. Guidance tests at Cape Canaveral quickly demonstrated the MARC system to be superior, and the first two production units were set up in September 1951.

MARC's line-of-sight communications limited the guided range to about 400 km (250 mi). MARC was initially envisioned to consist of a network of ground stations that would hand-off guidance of a missile between stations as it flew toward its target. In practice that was rarely successful, and deployed missiles did not attempt it. As with all radio communications it was also prone to enemy radio jamming.

In 1954, the USAF started to develop the YTM-61C version with SHANICLE. It became operational in 1957, extending the maximum flight range of the missile to about 620 miles (1,000 km). The Shanicle system was soon discontinued on operational missiles. By the late 1950s, all were using the MSQ-1 (called "MisCue-1" by the crews) ground-based guidance system.

A unique identifying feature of the TM-61C variant was the raised rear section of the fuselage above the jet exhaust, called the "doghouse" by those who were assigned to the missile squadrons. This had originally housed the SHANICLE electronics, but was retained when those systems were removed. The "doghouse" had no access panels or doors and was an aerodynamic structural component added to TM-61C and TM-76A to prevent missile "shudder" and breakup during terminal dive. It contained no functional components. The operational Matadors were zinc chromate green in their final versions, but this doghouse was quite often left natural aluminum, as were the wings and tail group.

The MSQ guidance vans required to guide the Matador were removed from Germany after September 1962 when the last Matador operational units were inactivated.

== Launch crew ==
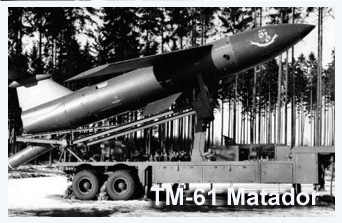
A Matador missile on its launcher near Hahn Air Base, West Germany.

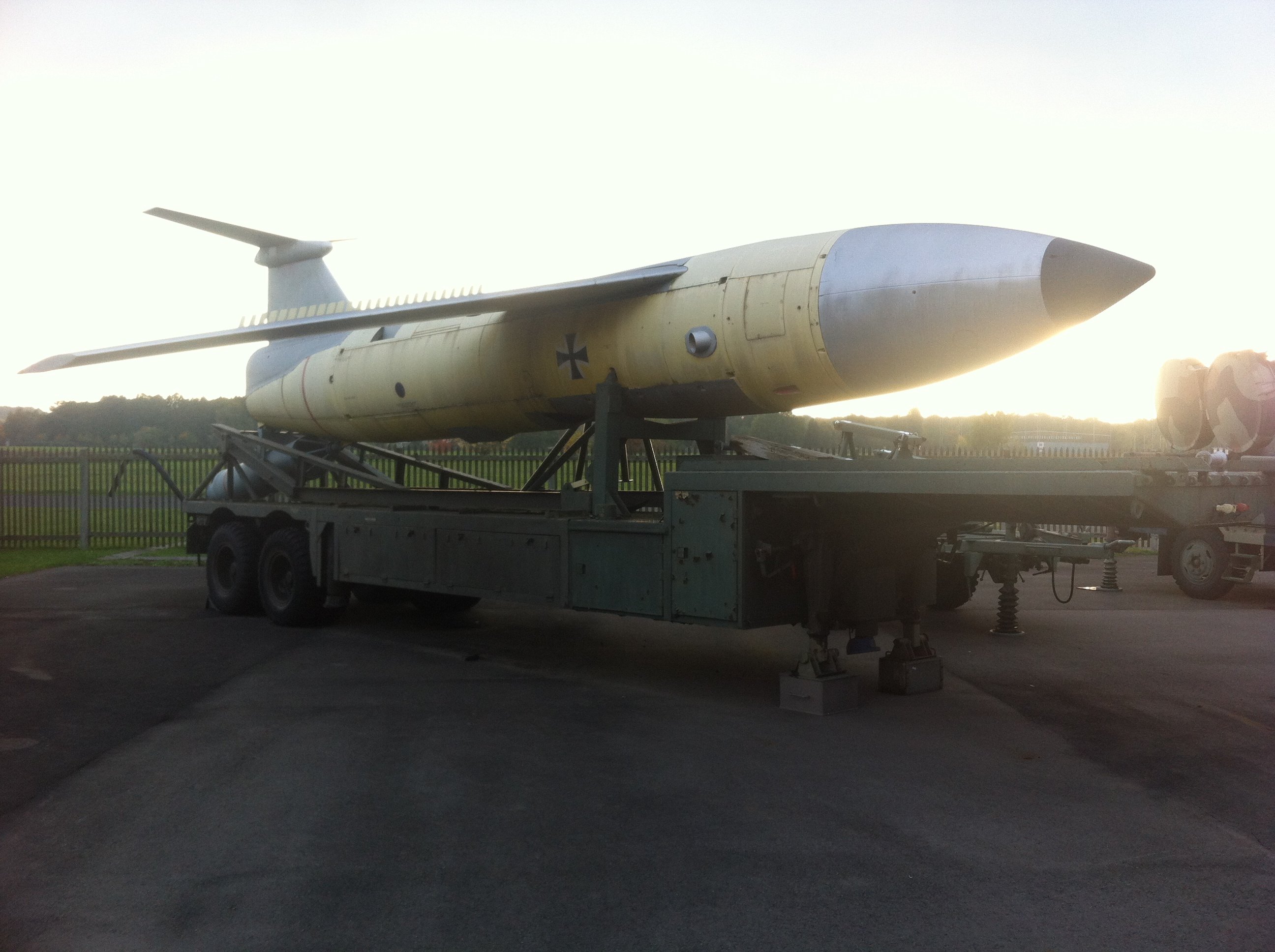
A Matador missile at Gatow, Germany.

The Matador launch crew consisted of eleven members. One launch officer, who was usually a 1st lieutenant (O-2) or a junior captain (O-3), one crew chief, usually a technical sergeant (E-6), two warhead techs, two flight control systems techs, two guidance techs, two airframe and engine techs—one of whom doubled as the crane operator and the other as the launcher tech, and one booster rocket tech. Since the missile was at least theoretically "mobile", all launch equipment was mounted on trucks and trailers. As a result, in addition to their primary duties, most crew members were trained as and doubled as drivers. All enlisted members other than the crew chief were usually airman second class (E-3) or airman (E-2) on their first enlistment, though there were sometimes staff sergeants (E-5) or even technical sergeants who had already served multiple enlistments. In addition, there were similarly-sized guidance crews on remote sites, and a maintenance staff for the missiles, the guidance equipment, and the vehicles. Because of the number of people required to support the missile, a "mobile" Matador squadron with five launch crews could grow quite cumbersome. As a result, the squadrons were soon deployed at fixed sites and the idea of a mobile missile was abandoned.

An individual Matador missile was shipped from the Martin plant to its unit in seven wooden crates. A single Matador missile required many vehicles to move it and its associated support equipment. There was a transport vehicle, which was a short wheelbase semi-trailer truck which carried the missile with the wings removed and attached alongside the fuselage, a launcher, which was a semi-trailer more than 40 feet (12 m) long weighing more than 30,000 lb (14 t). There was a target selection van, a warhead van, a 60 kW diesel generator, a tug, a hydraulic unit, a mobile blockhouse, and a truck-mounted hydraulic crane. There were several 2½ and 5 ton trucks (tractor type) to attach to and tow the launchers, transport vehicle, and generator. In some squadrons, each launch team had a large trailer in which it stored weapons, ammunition and supplies.

A typical missile launch site had an active, or "hot" pad on which was kept the missile most ready to launch. This pad was manned by the on-duty launch crew. According to the book, this required 15 minutes to do, but some crews could accomplish it in slightly more than 6 minutes. The site usually had a backup pad, on which was a missile which would require somewhat more effort to get it launched. This pad was manned by the standby crew, and if they were on site, could usually be ready to launch in 20–30 minutes. If there was a third pad, it may not have a missile on it at all. If one of the off-duty crews could make it to the launch site in time, they would try to get a missile onto the launcher there, and get it ready to go. Since all launch sites were within just a few minutes flying time from the potential enemy, it was unlikely that the third missile would launch, but all crews had multiple practice drills during their periods as duty and standby crews, trying to reduce the time needed to get the missiles away.

Often, these drills were accompanied by a flyover of a T-33 aircraft on which was mounted the MSQ-1 guidance system. (F-100 Super Sabres from the 36th and 50th TFWs were normally used for launch simulation exercises in Europe). This aircraft would fly over the launch pad at very low altitude and then simulate the flight profile of the missile under the control of the guidance crews. This gave the guidance crews practice controlling a missile in flight, as well as giving squadron officers some flight time.

The Matador flight profile was very simple and predictable, which no doubt contributed to its demise. When the launch officer pressed the two launch switches, the JATO bottle fired, accelerating the missile to 250 mph (400 km/h; 220 kn) in the space of two and a half seconds. At this point the JATO bottle fell away and the missile continued on a preset heading and rate of climb until it was acquired by the guidance crews and their equipment. The missile had no altitude or speed control, continuing to fly as fast as possible, climbing as the fuel load was burned off, until it reached its maximum altitude. At a point about 6 miles (10 km) from the intended target, the guidance crews sent the "dump" signal, which caused the missile to nose over into what was called the "terminal dive". This dive was near vertical, continuing until the missile reached the preset detonation altitude as determined by the radio altimeter, at which point the weapon exploded. Should the radio altimeter fail, a backup barometric detonator was used; should that fail, there was an impact detonator.

As with all missiles and bombers of the day, accuracy was not good in today's terms. Anything within a mile was considered a hit. Even though the missile was classified as a "tactical" weapon, in fact it was not technically capable of hitting individual targets, so it was likely targeted at cities near which a military installation such as an airfield existed. Actual targets were classified, and kept from everyone except the guidance officer.

== Variants and design stages ==
- MX-771: Original U.S. Air Force project number.
- SSM-A-1: Early proposed designation for operational missile. This designation was dropped before the first operational missiles were completed.
- XSSM-A-1: First designation applied to first prototypes for development of the missile airframe.
- YSSM-A-1: First designation applied to prototypes for development of the guidance system.
- B-61: Operational designation proposed to supersede SSM-A-1 designation. This designation was designed to classify the missile as a pilotless bomber.
- XB-61: Redesignation of the XSSM-A-1
- YB-61: Redesignation of the YSSM-A-1
- B-61A: First production version of the Matador. Principal difference from the XB-61 and YB-61 was redesign of the airframe with high wings in place of the previous mid-mounted wings.
- TM-61A: Redesignation of the B-61A as the USAF decided to classify the Matador as a tactical missile instead of a pilotless bomber.
- TM-61B: Significant redesign of the TM-61A, ultimately being redesignated as its own system, the TM-76 Mace.
- TM-61C: Improved TM-61A developed as a stop-gap as the TM-61B was under development.
- MGM-1C: Redesignation of the TM-61C in 1963 to meet new aircraft and missile designation standards adopted by the USAF. Only the TM-61C required redesignation as the TM-61A had been fully withdrawn from service and the TM-61B had been redesignated the TM-76 Mace, and ultimately received the MGM-13 designation.

== Operators ==
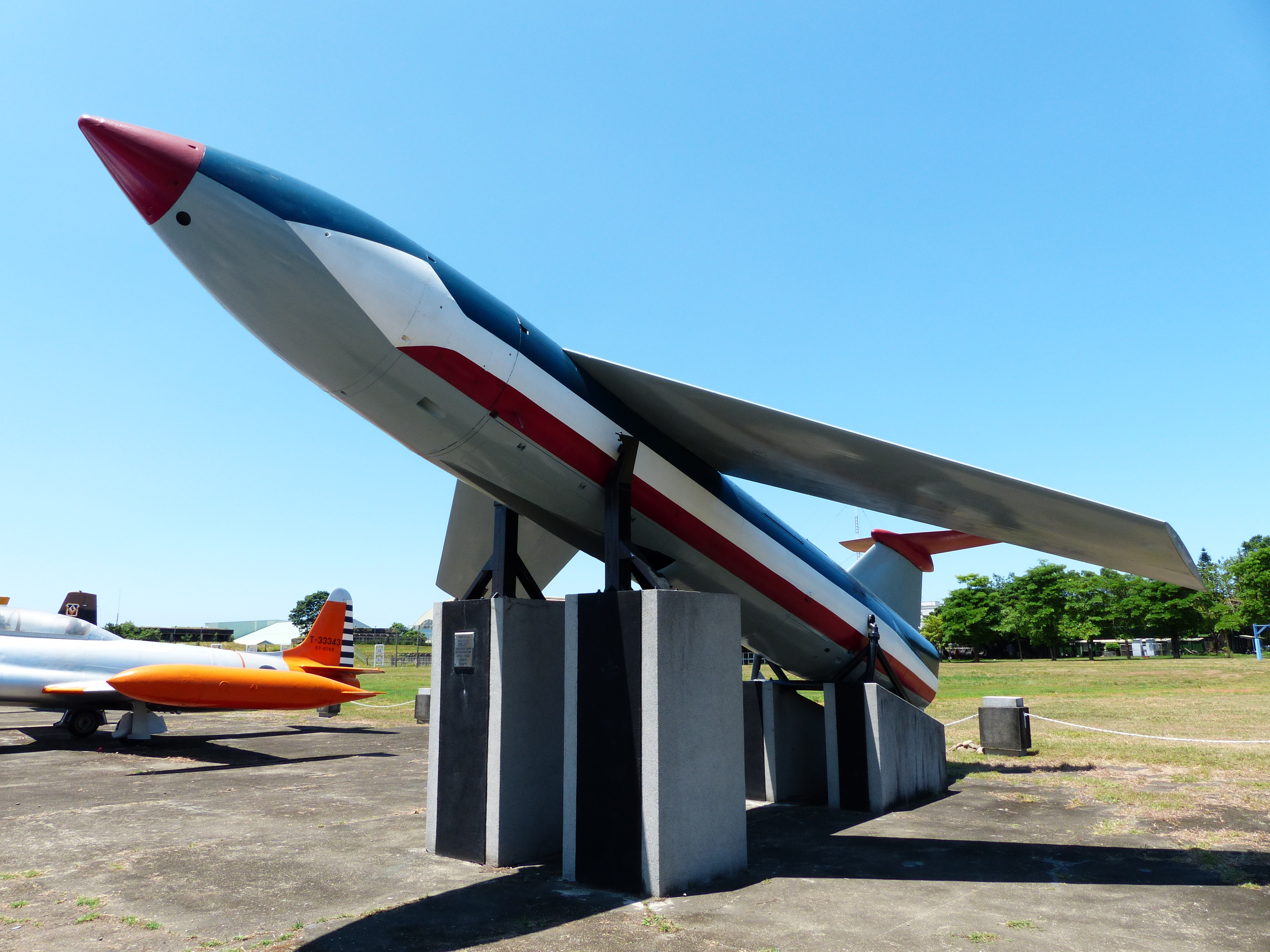
MGM-1C Matador Display at Tainan Air Force Base

United States: The United States Air Force

- 4504th Missile Training Wing - Orlando AFB, Florida
  - 4504th Tactical Missile Training Squadron
- 38th Tactical Missile Wing
  - 1st Pilotless Bomber Squadron - Bitburg AB, Germany
  - 2d Pilotless Bomber Squadron - Hahn AB, Germany
  - 69th Tactical Missile Squadron
- 58th Tactical Missile Group
  - 11th Tactical Missile Squadron
  - 71st Tactical Missile Squadron
  - 310th Tactical Missile Squadron - Osan, Korea
  - 868th Tactical Missile Squadron - Tainan, Taiwan

Germany: Bundeswehr

- Flugkörpergruppe 11 - Kaufbeuren Air Base

== Surviving units ==
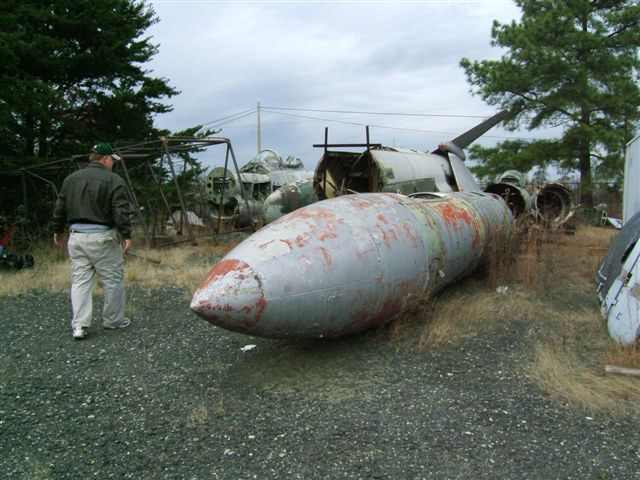
Unrestored Matador missile from Florence Air and Missile Museum at Carolinas Aviation Museum in Charlotte, North Carolina (KCLT)

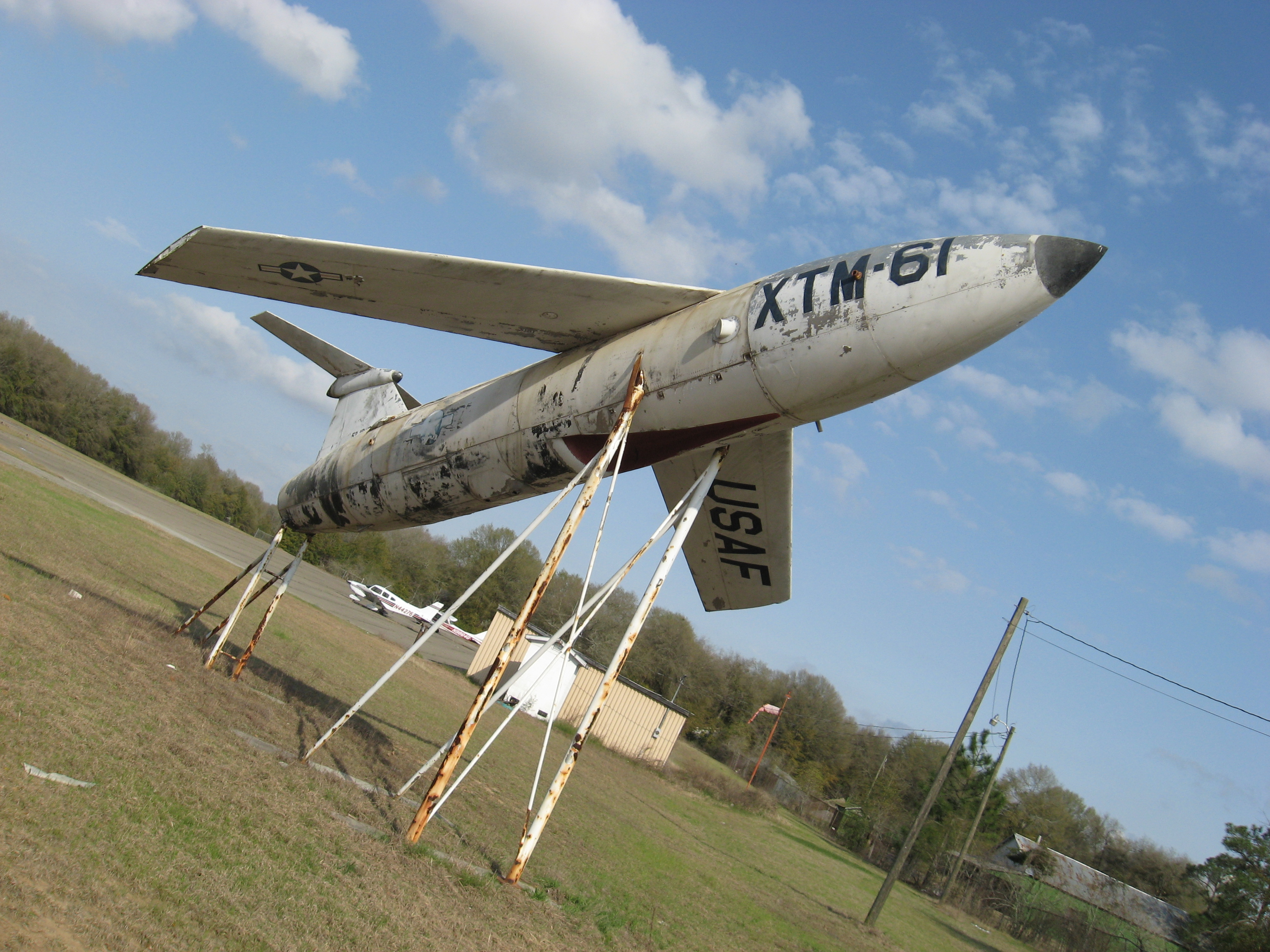
"XTM-61" on static display at Hawkinsville-Pulaski County Airport in Hawkinsville, Georgia

Below is a list of museums with a Matador missile in their collection:

Germany

- A "Bitburg"-Matador survives as a missile monument at the former 38th Combat Support Wing GLCM station "Pydna" at Wüschheim
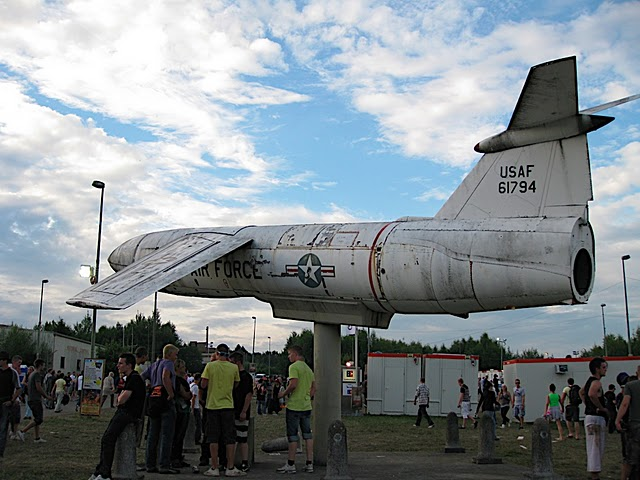
  Cruise missile at Pydna
- Luftwaffenmuseum der Bundeswehr, Berlin,
- Auto und Technik Museum Sinsheim, Germany

United States

- Air Force Space and Missile Museum, Cape Canaveral Space Force Station, Florida. This pristine artifact is in sequestered storage in Hangar R on Cape Canaveral AFS and cannot be viewed by the general public.
- Carolinas Aviation Museum, Charlotte, North Carolina. This Matador was formerly on display at the Florence Air and Missile Museum in Florence, South Carolina.
- Museum of Aviation, Robins Air Force Base, Georgia TM-61A Serial #52-1891
- National Air and Space Museum, Dulles International Airport
- National Museum of the United States Air Force, Wright-Patterson Air Force Base, Dayton, Ohio
- National Museum of Nuclear Science & History, adjacent to Kirtland Air Force Base in Albuquerque, New Mexico
- Planes of Fame Air Museum, Valle, Arizona
- A TM-61C Matador, Serial # 56-1955 is on display near Pikeville, North Carolina, in a parking lot.
- "XTM-61" Serial #52-1872 is on static display at Hawkinsville-Pulaski County Airport, Hawkinsville, Georgia.
- A Matador of unknown variation is on display in front of Veterans of Foreign Wars Post 160 at Baltimore/Washington Thurgood Marshall International Airport, Glen Burnie, Maryland.

== See also ==
Related development

- MGM-13 Mace – (United States)

Aircraft of comparable role, configuration, and era

- UB.109T – (United Kingdom)

Related lists

- List of military aircraft of the United States
- List of missiles
