= 836th Air Division =

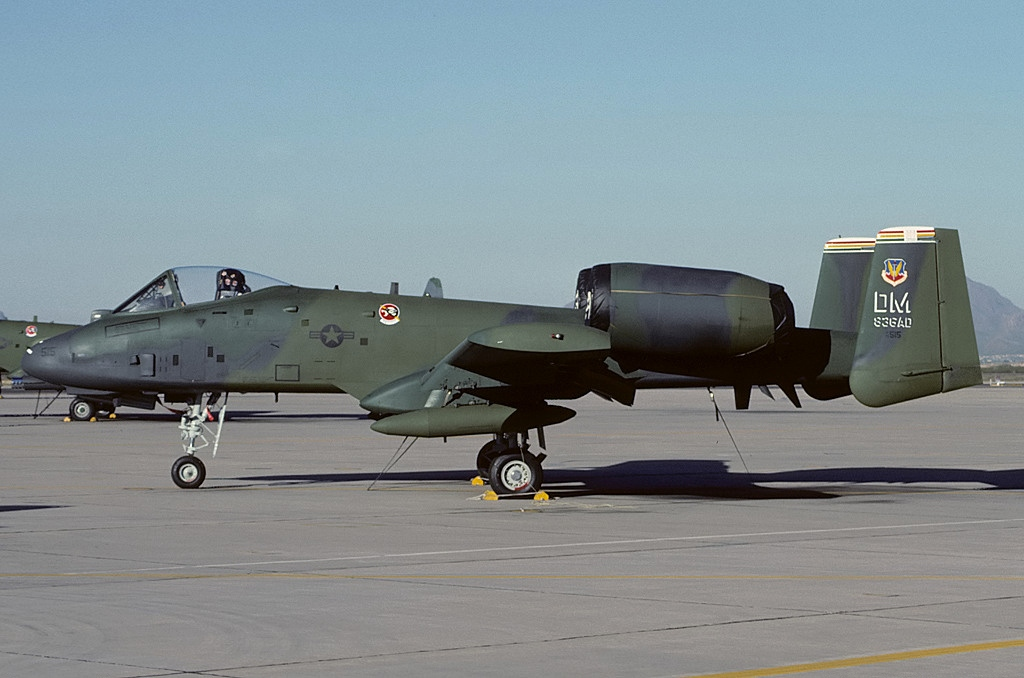
- A-10 Thunderbolt II of the division's 355th Tactical Training Wing (Note: Aircraft is Republic A-10A Thunderbolt II, serial 76-0515. This aircraft is on display at Osan Air Base. Baugher, Joe (6 November 2022). "1976 USAF Serial Numbers". Joe Baugher. Note 836 AD marking on tail.)
- Active: 1957–1961; 1962–1971; 1981–1992
- Country: United States
- Branch: United States Air Force
- Role: Command of tactical forces
- Motto(s): Ubique Semper (Latin for 'Always and Everywhere')
- Decorations: Air Force Outstanding Unit Award

Commanders
- Notable commanders: Gen Ronald R. Fogleman; Lt Gen Kenneth L. Tallman (Note: Eugene D. Santarelli also reached the rank of Lieutenant General.)

Insignia
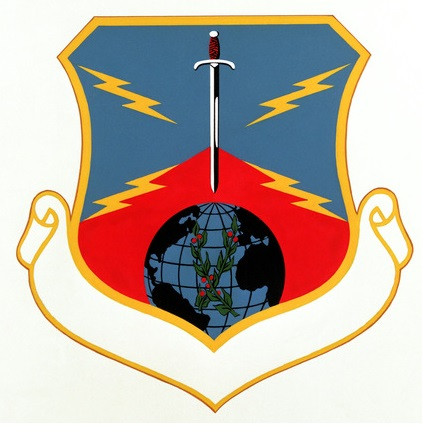
- 836th Air Division emblem (Note: Revised April 1982. Description: Per chevron celeste and gules issuing from base a sphere of the first [color mentioned] with axis palewise, rimmed and gridlined sable with land masses of the like [color] surmounted by two arced olive branches saltirewise vert with berries of the second [color mentioned] below in pale a sword with blade to base argent garnished of the third [color mentioned], hilt of the second [color mentioned] within four lightning flashes saltirewise or all within a diminished bordure of the last [color mentioned].)

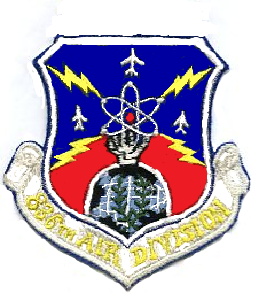
- Patch with original 836th Air Division emblem (Note: Approved 9 May 1958.)

The 836th Air Division is an inactive United States Air Force organization. Its last assignment was with Tactical Air Command (TAC) at Davis-Monthan Air Force Base, Arizona, where it was inactivated on 1 May 1992. The division had been activated at Davis-Monthan in January 1981 to replace Tactical Training, Davis-Monthan. Its primary mission was training for Fairchild A-10 Thunderbolt II and BGM-109G Gryphon crews. The 602d Tactical Control Wing moved to Davis-Monthan, and the division's training mission expanded to include Forward Air Controllers flying several aircraft. The BGM-109 mission ended with the signing of the Intermediate-Range Nuclear Forces Treaty. In 1989, division elements participated in Operation Just Cause. The division was inactivated with the implementation of the Objective Wing reorganization, which established a single wing on each Air Force Base.

The division was first activated in 1957 at Langley Air Force Base, Virginia as the command headquarters for the 405th Fighter-Bomber Wing and the 345th Bombardment Wing, along with base support organizations assigned to its 836th Air Base Group. Division bombers deployed overseas in response to the Lebanon Crisis of 1958 and the Second Taiwan Strait Crisis. By 1961, the division's responsibilities had shifted with the inactivation of the 345th and 405th Wings, and it commanded the 4505th Air Refueling Wing and 4440th Aircraft Delivery Group, which had replaced them at Langley. With only a single wing remaining at Langley, the division was inactivated on 1 July 1961.

The division was again activated in 1962 at MacDill Air Force Base, Florida when TAC took over that base from Strategic Air Command. The two tactical fighter wings at MacDill were initially equipped with obsolescent Republic F-84F Thunderstreaks, but soon became the first McDonnell F-4 Phantom II wings in the Air Force. Beginning in 1964, division units began deploying for combat in Southeast Asia, and eventually two entire wings moved to South Vietnam. Until the 836th inactivated in 1971, its remaining components acted primarily as training units for the Phantom II and, after 1968, for the Tropic Moon B-57G. During the Pueblo Crisis, the division deployed elements to reinforce Pacific Air Forces units in Korea.

== History ==
=== Langley Air Force Base ===
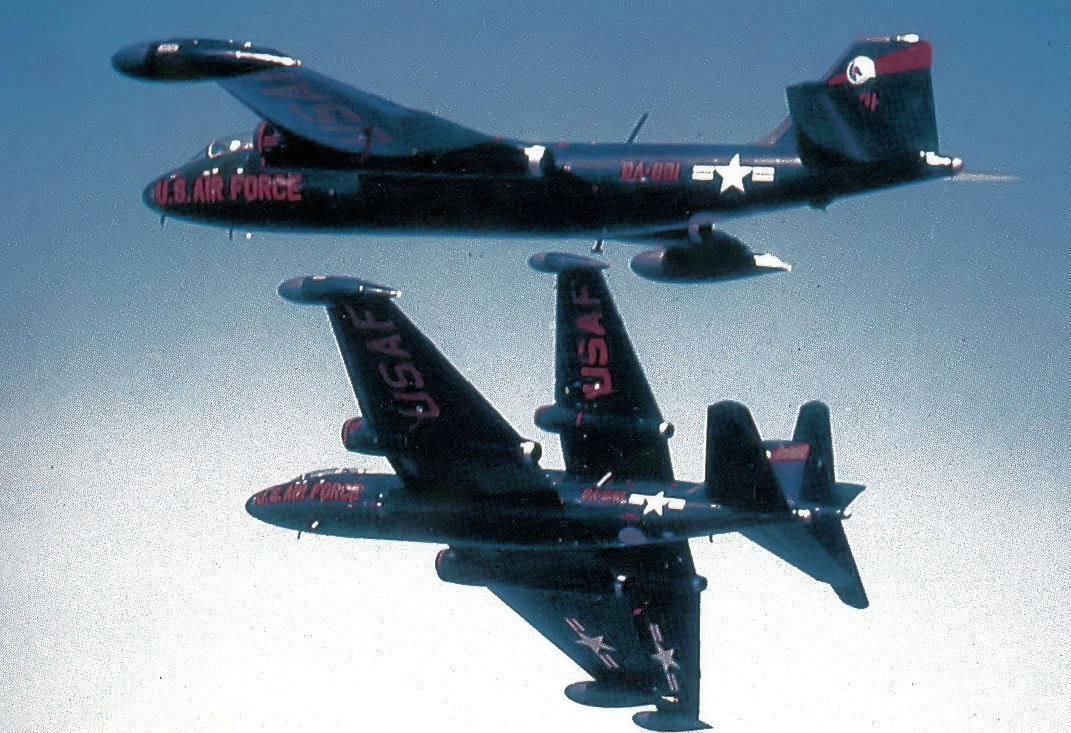
345th Bombardment Wing B-57B Canberras

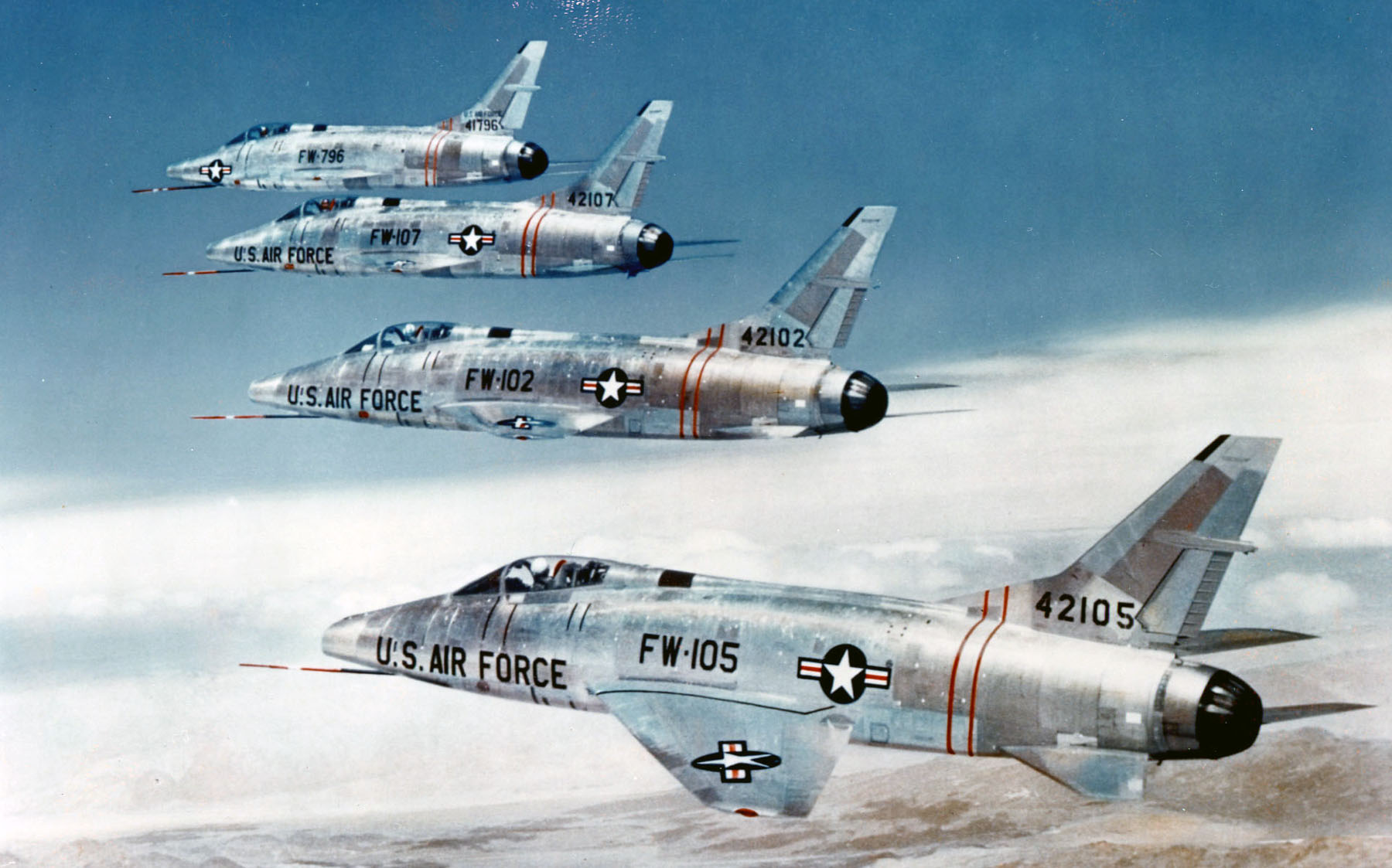
F-100 formation (Note: Aircraft are North American F-100C-5-NA Super Sabre serial 54-1796 (crashed 10 Aug 1957, pilot ejected), and F-100C-25-NAs 54–2102 (later with USAFE Skyblazers demonstration team), 54–2105 and 54-2107.)

The 836th Air Division was first organized in October 1957 at Langley Air Force Base, Virginia as the command headquarters for the 405th Fighter-Bomber Wing, equipped with North American F-100 Super Sabre aircraft, and the newly activated 345th Bombardment Wing flying Martin B-57 Canberras, both of which were stationed at Langley. The 405th Wing also had the 429th Air Refueling Squadron with Boeing KB-50 Superfortresses attached to it.

In July 1958, the 405th Wing at Langley was inactivated. Although consideration had also been given in 1958 to inactivating the 345th Wing, international conditions delayed this action. In response to the Lebanon Crisis of 1958, Tactical Air Command deployed Composite Air Strike Force Bravo to Adana Air Base, Turkey. The 836th was tasked to provide one squadron of twelve B-57s to support this force. The B-57s, drawn from the 345th Wing's 498th Bombardment Squadron, were the first strike aircraft of the force to depart for Adana. Although the bombers returned to Langley in the fall, the Taiwan Strait Crisis of 1958 called for a detachment of Canberras to deploy to Okinawa. Once these planes had returned to Langley, the 345th began to prepare for inactivation in June 1959, leaving the division with one wing and one group assigned.

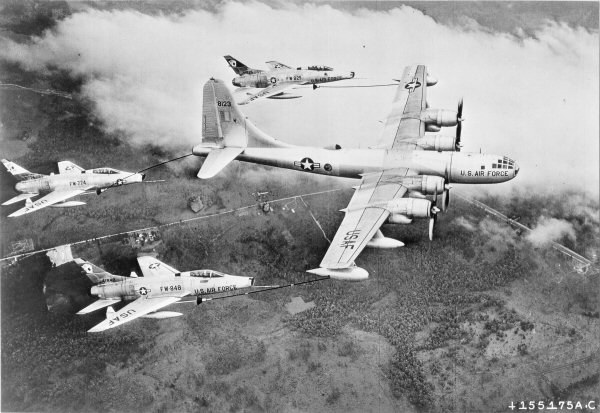
4505 Air Refueling Wing KB-50 (Note: Aircraft is Boeing B-50D-105-BO, serial 48–123, converted to tanker configuration as a KB-50D, later modified as KB-50J, assigned to the 4505th wing's 622d Air Refueling Squadron. The three F-100 receivers were assigned to the 451st Fighter-Day Squadron. Sent to the Military Aircraft Storage and Disposition Center (MASDC) on 16 January 1963 and reclaimed on 21 May 1963. Baugher, Joe (12 July 2023). "1946-1948 USAF Serial Numbers". Joe Baugher. This was the first triple point refueling of operational aircraft.)

At nearly the same time the 405th Wing inactivated, TAC formed the 4505th Air Refueling Wing at Langley as a single headquarters for its air refueling squadrons, which were located on several bases. The wing's squadrons flew Boeing KB-50J and KB-50H Stratofortresses, which added two jet engines to the B-50's original four reciprocating engines, and were designed to refuel three tactical aircraft at the same time. The 4505th also had a secondary mission of conducting antisubmarine warfare. Although initially assigned directly to TAC headquarters, the wing was attached to the division in September 1958, then assigned in November and the division once again commanded two wings at Langley. One month after the 4505th Wing was added to the division's strength, the 4440th Aircraft Delivery Group was added to the division. The 4440th supervised delivery of aircraft from manufacturers and modification centers to operational units after TAC took over the delivery mission from the 1708th Ferrying Wing of Military Air Transport Service. Tankers from the 4505th provided air refueling support for the delivery missions of the 4440th.

When the division inactivated in July 1961, the 4440th Aircraft Delivery Group reported directly to TAC, while the 4505th Air Refueling Wing was reassigned to Ninth Air Force.

=== MacDill Air Force Base ===
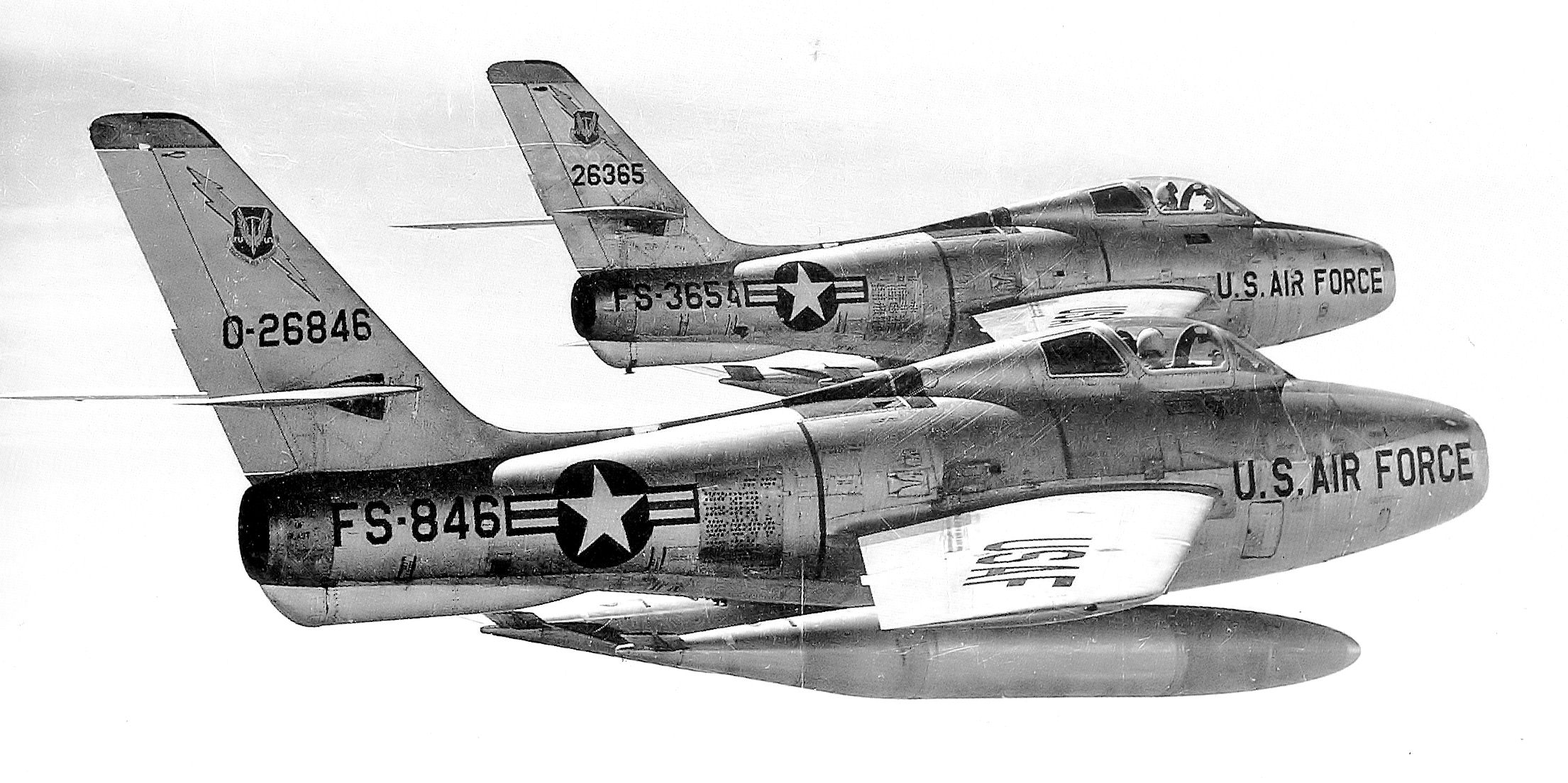
12th Tactical Fighter Wing F-84Fs (Note: Aircraft are Republic F-84F Thunderstreaks, serials 52-6846 (F-84F-50-RE, crashed on 3 October 1970, airframe later was put on display at the Kalamazoo Aviation History Museum) and serial 52-6365 (F-84F-30-RE, sent to MASDC on 22 December 1970, declared excess on 7 January 1972 and scrapped) Baugher, Joe (15 July 2023). "1952 USAF Serial Numbers". Joe Baugher.)

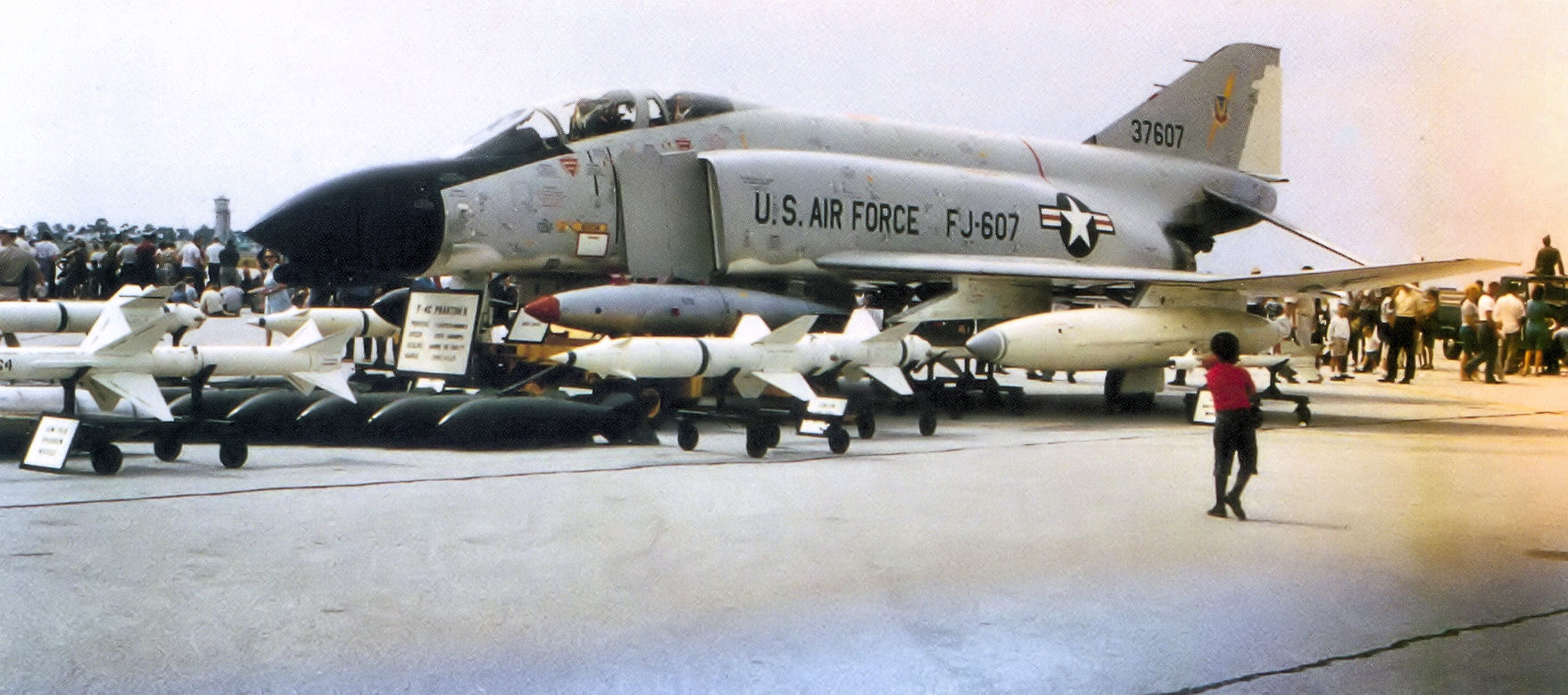
12th Tactical Fighter Wing F-4 (Note: Aircraft is McDonnell F-4C-20-MC Phantom serial 63-7607. This aircraft was modified as an EF-4C Wild Weasel air defense suppression aircraft. The aircraft survived the Vietnam War, and was sent to the Aerospace Maintenance and Regeneration Center (AMARC) on 14 August 1991. It was salvaged on 1 June 1999. Baugher, Joe (26 July 2023). "1963 USAF Serial Numbers". Joe Baugher. Photo taken in 1964.)

The 836th was activated a second time in July 1962 at MacDill Air Force Base, Florida, when TAC replaced Strategic Air Command as MacDill's host and the division's 836th Combat Support Group became the base's support organization. The 12th Tactical Fighter Wing, which moved to MacDill from Bergstrom Air Force Base, Texas was assigned to the 836th, along with the 15th Tactical Fighter Wing, activated the same day as the division. Although these two wings were originally equipped with Republic F-84F Thunderstreak aircraft, by 1964 they became the first two McDonnell F-4 Phantom II wings in the Air Force.

Initially, the 15th Wing provided logistical support and trained crews for both wings. However, it reorganized as a mission capable tactical fighter wing for the Cuban Missile Crisis in October. Once the wings began to equip with the Phantom, the 15th Wing resumed the role of training crews on the new fighter.

In October 1964 the division once again included the Super Sabre in its inventory, when the 31st Tactical Fighter Wing at Homestead Air Force Base, Florida, was assigned. This assignment also marked the first time the division was responsible for a wing stationed at another base. The division added the 33d Tactical Fighter Wing when that wing activated at Eglin Air Force Base, Florida in April 1965. The 836th supervised tests for weapon systems, aircraft armament and munitions, and tactical procedures through the 33d Wing, which included a test support division until December 1967, when its test operations expanded to include a full squadron.

The division's wings at MacDill began deployments of their Phantoms to the Pacific for combat operations, beginning in December 1964 with the 555th Tactical Fighter Squadron of the 12th Wing. Continuing through most of 1965, either the 12th or 15th Wing had one of its squadrons detached for combat operations in Southeast Asia. In November 1965, the entire 12th Wing moved to the new base at Cam Ranh Air Base, Vietnam. The wing's 557th and 559th Tactical Fighter Squadrons were briefly assigned directly to the division until they could join the wing at Cam Ranh.

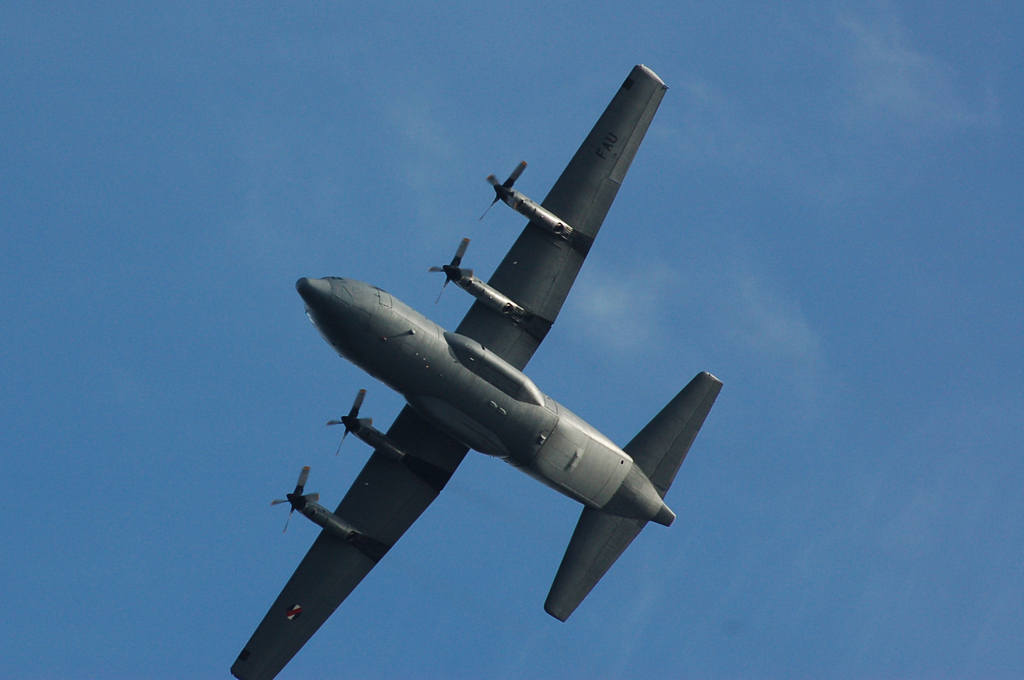
C130 Hercules as operated by the 4409th Support Squadron

In 1966 the 31st Wing became the second division wing to open operations at a new base in Vietnam when it left Homestead with its F-100s for Tuy Hoa Air Base. Its personnel remaining at Homestead were reorganized into the 4531st Tactical Fighter Wing. The 4531st began equipping with the Phantom II to prepare for its new mission as an F-4 Replacement Training Unit, although its first replacement class did not start until June 1967 and it would be November 1967 before the wing was able to graduate its first class. The wing also operated Lockheed AT-33 T-Birds to conduct the air-to-air portion of replacement training and maintained Piasecki H-21 helicopters to support TAC's Sea Survival School, which moved to Homestead.

The division again deployed subordinate units to Southeast Asia for combat operations starting in 1967. (Note: The AFHRA Factsheet for the division states deployments continued in 1972 and 1973. Although its former components continued to deploy, this statement is in error because the division was inactive. Factsheet, 836th Air Division.) Its 33d Wing trained entire combat ready squadrons, which deployed to the Pacific, where they were reflagged and returned to Eglin to form once again. Its 4th Tactical Fighter Squadron deployed in this manner once, while the 16th and 40th Tactical Fighter Squadrons each deployed two times between May 1967 and November 1968. In November 1969, the 40th deployed a third time, but did not return to reform.

The 4531st Wing acted as the active duty air advisory unit for several Air National Guard fighter and air refueling units. As a result, in May 1968, when the Pueblo Crisis occurred, two National Guard groups, the 174th Tactical Fighter Group at Martin State Airport, Maryland and the 175th Tactical Fighter Group at Hancock Field, New York were activated and assigned to the division. These two groups were soon transferred to Cannon Air Force Base, where they reinforced the 140th Tactical Fighter Wing. In addition, the 4531st Wing deployed twenty F-4s of its 68th and 560th Tactical Fighter Squadrons and supporting personnel to Kunsan Air Base to expand the Air Force's presence in Korea. The 15th Wing moved a squadron of its Phantoms to Seymour Johnson Air Force Base to temporarily replace some of the 4th Tactical Fighter Wing planes that had also deployed to Korea.

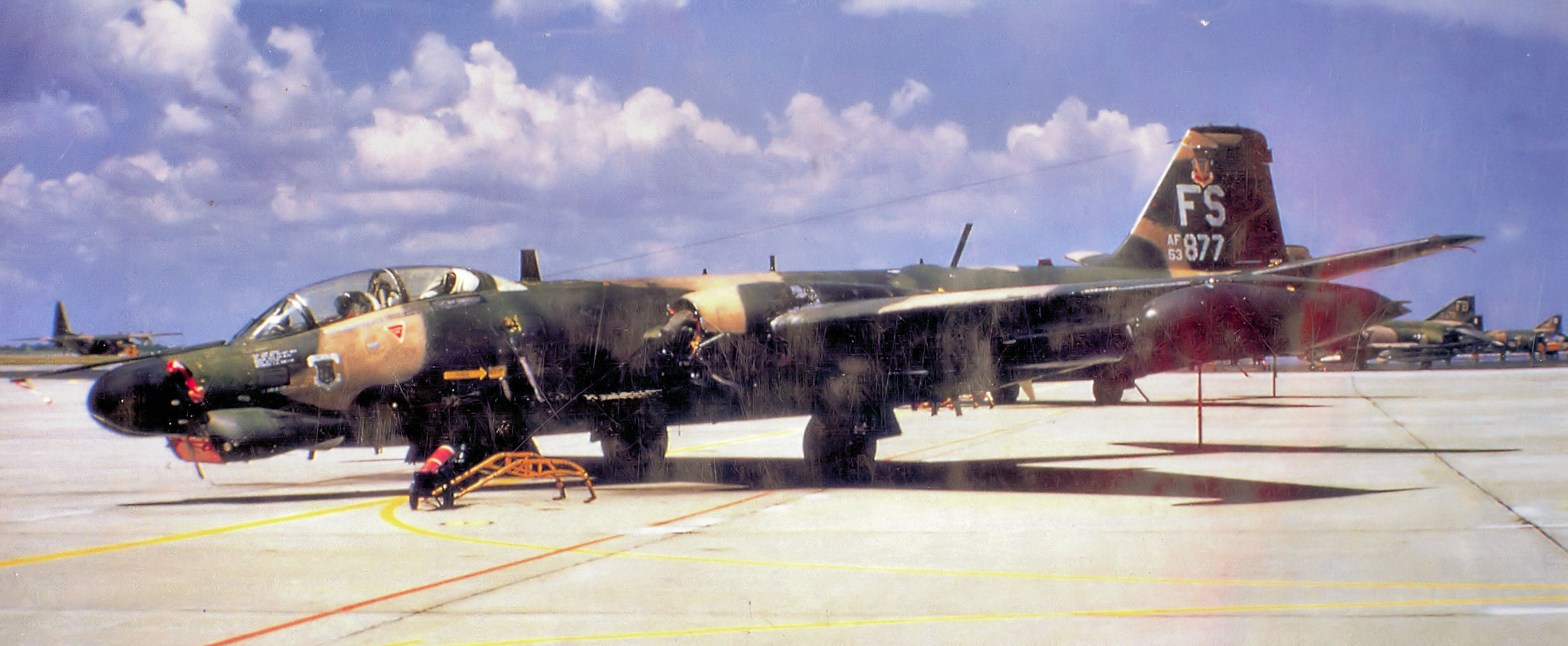
Martin B-57G of the 4424th Combat Crew Training Squadron. (Note: Aircraft is Martin B-57B-MA, serial 53-3877, photo taken at MacDill AFB after it was modified to B-57G Tropic Moon configuration. Sent to MASDC on 7 February 1974 and declared excess on 15 May. Baugher, Joe (5 August 2023). "1953 USAF Serial Numbers". Joe Baugher.)

Later, in October 1968 the division began supervising B-57 bomber aircrew training, which moved from Clark Air Base, Philippines. This now included training on the Tropic Moon B-57G, which was modified with sensors to increase its efficiency as a night attack aircraft. The 836th organized the first operational B-57G squadron, the 13th Bombardment Squadron.

On 5 October 1969, a Cuban MiG-17 landed at one of the division's Florida bases, Homestead Air Force Base. The aircraft was not detected on radar as it entered United States airspace, and its pilot parked it next to Air Force One, which was on the Homestead ramp at the time. Although improvements to air defense in the southern United States were directed as a result of this incident, they had little impact on the division, which was almost entirely devoted to training crews for the war in Vietnam.

On 1 October 1970, the 1st Tactical Fighter Wing absorbed the mission, personnel and equipment of the 15th Wing after moving on paper from Hamilton Air Force Base, California. The division was inactivated in 1971 and its units reassigned to Ninth Air Force.

=== Davis-Monthan Air Force Base ===
The division was again activated at Davis Monthan Air Force Base in January 1981, when it replaced Tactical Training, Davis-Monthan and assumed its personnel and equipment. The division's operational component was the 355th Tactical Training Wing, flying Fairchild Republic A-10 Thunderbolt IIs, and the 836th Combat Support Group was assigned to provide support for all units at Davis-Monthan, including The Military Aircraft Storage and Disposition Center. The division was the Air Force focal point for A-10 aircraft tactics, training, employment and readiness. The division was also assigned the 868th Tactical Missile Training Squadron, which trained Air Force personnel on the BGM-109G Gryphon.

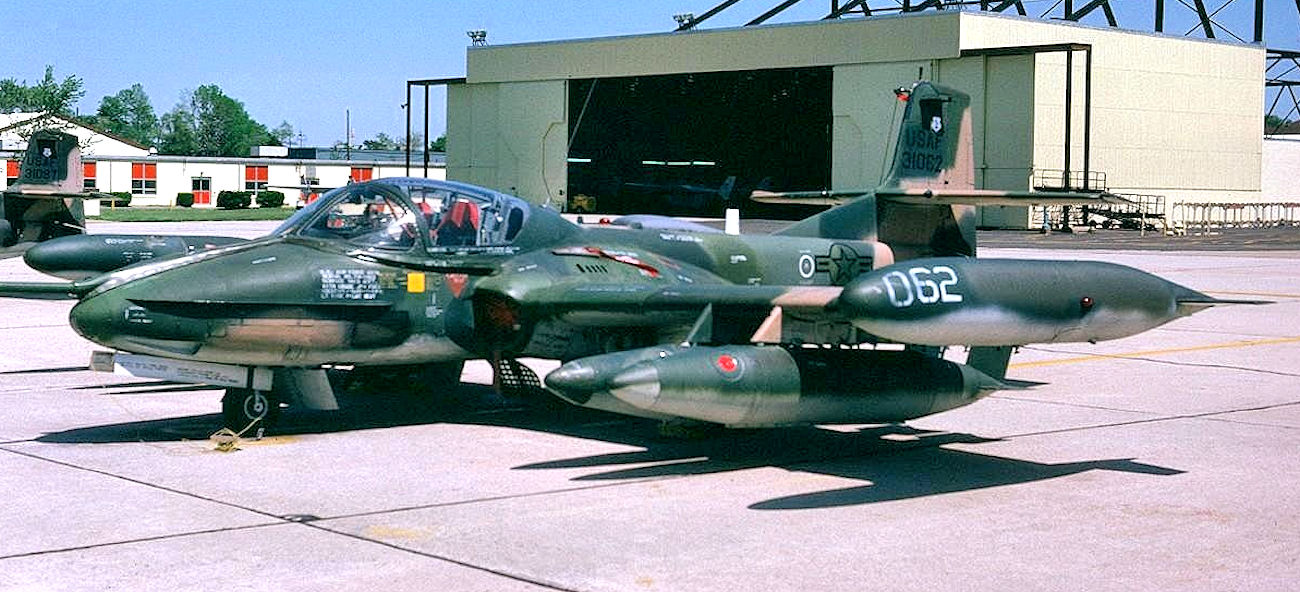
Cessna A-37B as flown by the 23d TASS

In September 1982, the 602d Tactical Air Control Wing moved to Davis-Monthan from Bergstrom Air Force Base and was assigned to the division. The 23d Tactical Air Support Squadron, assigned to the 602d Wing, conducted Forward Air Controller training with the Cessna OA-37 Dragonfly, and later the North American OV-10 Bronco and the OA-10 Thunderbolt II. In 1989, elements of the 602d deployed to support Operation Just Cause, the operation to remove Manuel Noriega as ruler of Panama.

In 1985, the 868th Tactical Missile Training Group was activated and assigned to the division as the headquarters for the 868th Tactical Missile Training Squadron. The 868th Group was inactivated in May 1990 as the Intermediate-Range Nuclear Forces Treaty was implemented and the Gryphon removed from the Air Force's inventory. However, the training capability of the 868th proved useful during Operation Desert Storm. The Air Force had determined to use ground launched Northrop BQM-74 Chukar drones as decoys to degrade the Iraqi air defense system. Taking advantage of the 868th's experience in operating ground launched missiles, the 4468th Tactical Group was formed from its former members in September 1990 and deployed to Saudi Arabia in October to operate two launch sites near the Iraqi border. On 17 January 1991, these decoys, together with Navy air-launched decoys were sent against Iraqi air defenses in Operation Scathe Mean. Iraqi radars engaging the decoys were then attacked by anti-radar missiles, degrading the air defenses of Baghdad. After the end of the war the 4468th was inactivated in 1992.

The division was inactivated in May 1992 as the Air Force implemented the Objective Wing reorganization, which established a single wing as the headquarters for each base. The 355th Fighter Wing was reassigned directly to Twelfth Air Force and the mission and personnel of the 836th Combat Support Group were transferred to the 355th Support Group.

== Lineage ==
- Established as the 836 Air Division on 26 September 1957

Activated on 8 October 1957
Discontinued and inactivated on 1 July 1961

- Activated on 14 June 1962 (not organized)

Organized on 1 July 1962
Inactivated on 30 June 1971

- Activated on 1 January 1981

Inactivated on 1 May 1992

=== Assignments ===
- Ninth Air Force, 8 October 1957 – 1 July 1961
- Tactical Air Command, 14 June 1962 (not organized)
- Ninth Air Force, 1 July 1962 – 30 June 1971
- Twelfth Air Force, 1 January 1981 – 1 May 1992

=== Stations ===
- Langley Air Force Base, Virginia, 8 October 1957 – 1 July 1961
- MacDill Air Force Base, Florida, 1 July 1962 – 30 June 1971
- Davis Monthan Air Force Base, Arizona, 1 January 1981 – 1 May 1992

=== Components ===
Wings

- 1st Tactical Fighter Wing: 1 October 1970 – 30 June 1971
- 12th Tactical Fighter Wing: 1 July 1962 – 8 November 1965
- 15th Tactical Fighter Wing: 1 July 1962 – 1 October 1970
- 31st Tactical Fighter Wing: 1 October 1964 – 1 January 1965; 1 August – 25 December 1966 (attached to Seventh Air Force after 6 December 1966)

Homestead Air Force Base, Florida

- 33d Tactical Fighter Wing: 1 April 1965 – 30 June 1971

Eglin Air Force Base, Florida

- 345th Bombardment Wing: 8 October 1957 – 25 June 1959 (Note: The AFHRA Factsheet indicates this assignment terminated on 1 July 1958, but this appears to be a typographical error, repeating the dates for the 405th Wing. The 345th remained at Langley and was assigned to the 836th until inactivated in 1959. Ravenstein p. 182; Mueller, p. 316.)
- 355th Tactical Training Wing (later 355th Fighter Wing): 1 January 1981 – 1 May 1992
- 405th Fighter-Bomber Wing: 8 October 1957 – 1 July 1958
- 602d Tactical Air Control Wing: 1 September 1982 – 1 May 1992
- 4453d Combat Crew Training Wing (see 4453d Combat Crew Training Squadron)
- 4505th Air Refueling Wing: attached 1 September – 31 October 1958, assigned 1 November 1958 – 1 July 1961
- 4531st Tactical Fighter Wing: 1 November 1966 – 15 October 1970

Groups

- 174th Tactical Fighter Group: 13 May – 1 June 1968
- 175th Tactical Fighter Group: 13 May – 1 June 1968
- 836th Air Base Group (later 836th Combat Support Group): 8 February 1957 – 22 March 1960, 1 July 1962 – 8 January 1969, 1 October 1981 – 1 May 1992
- 868th Tactical Missile Training Group: 1 November 1985 – 31 May 1990
- 4440th Aircraft Delivery Group: attached 1 December 1958 – 31 January 1959, assigned 1 February 1959 – 31 March 1960
- 4440th Aircraft Delivery Group: 1 April 1960 – 1 July 1961 (different from above organization)
- 4453d Combat Crew Training Group (see 4453d Combat Crew Training Squadron)
- 4468th Tactical Group (later 4468th Tactical Reconnaissance Group; 4468th Reconnaissance Group): 27 September 1990 – 1 May 1992

Squadrons

- 557th Tactical Fighter Squadron: 18 November – 1 December 1965
- 559th Tactical Fighter Squadron: 8 November – 27 December 1965
- 868th Tactical Missile Training Squadron: 1 July 1981 – 1 November 1985
- 4409th Support Squadron: 1 June 1965 – 1 February 1969

Homestead Air Force Base, Florida after 1968

- 4453d Combat Crew Training Squadron (later 4453d Combat Crew Training Group, 4453d Combat Crew Training Wing): 1 January 1963 – 1 July 1964

=== Aircraft and missiles ===
- Martin B-57 Canberra, 1957–1959; 1968–1969; 1970–1971
- North American F-100 Super Sabre, 1957–1958; 1964; 1966
- Boeing KB-50 Superfortress, 1957–1961
- Republic F-84F Thunderstrreak, 1962–1964
- McDonnell F-4 Phantom II, 1963–1971
- Lockheed C-130 Hercules, 1965–1971
- North American F-86 Sabre, 1968
- Fairchild Republic A-10 Thunderbolt II, 1981–1992

Includes OA-10 models

- Cessna OA-37 Dragonfly, 1982–1991
- North American OV-10 Bronco, c. 1986–1991
- BGM-109G Gryphon, 1981–1989
- Northrop BQM-74 Chukar, 1990–1991

=== Commanders ===
- Col Harold P. Sparks, 8 October 1957
- Brig Gen Edwin S. Chickering, 14 October 1957
- Col Gene H. Tibbets, 29 June 1958
- Brig Gen Perry B. Griffith, 15 August 1958
- Col Robert C. Orth, c. July 1960 – c. July 1961
- Col Stanton T. Smith Jr., c. 1 July 1962
- Brig Gen Gilbert L. Meyers, by April 1963
- Col Woodrow W. Ramsey, c. 1 January 1964
- Brig Gen Albert W. Schinz, c. 16 January 1964
- Brig Gen Frank J. Collins, 29 July 1965
- Col Raymond A. Bradley, c. 1 September 1967
- Brig Gen Augustus M. Hendry Jr., 1 December 1967
- Brig Gen Paul P. Douglas Jr., 19 February 1969
- Col Franklin L. Fisher, 6 February 1970
- Brig Gen Kenneth L. Tallman, 20 July 1970 – 30 June 1971
- Brig Gen Robert I. McCann, 1 January 1981
- Brig Gen Alan P. Lurie, 23 November 1982
- Brig Gen Ronald R. Fogleman, 4 September 1984
- Brig Gen Lester P. Brown Jr., 27 March 1986
- Brig Gen Larry R. Keith; 1 June 1987
- Brig Gen Walter T. Worthington, 1 September 1988
- Brig Gen Thomas R. Griffith, 31 January 1990
- Brig Gen Eugene D. Santarelli, 5 July 1990 – 1 May 1992

=== Awards ===
Award streamer	Award	Dates	Notes
	Air Force Outstanding Unit Award	1 July 1985 – 30 June 1987	

== See also ==
- List of B-50 units of the United States Air Force
- List of F-86 Sabre units
- List of F-100 units of the United States Air Force
- List of Lockheed C-130 Hercules operators
- List of United States Air Force air divisions
- McDonnell Douglas F-4 Phantom II non-U.S. operators
- Tropic Moon
