= 22d Reconnaissance Squadron (disambiguation) =

22d Reconnaissance Squadron may refer to:

- The 912th Air Refueling Squadron, constituted as the 22d Reconnaissance Squadron (Heavy) in January 1942 but redesignated the 412th Bombardment Squadron before being activated in June 1942.
- The 22d Intelligence Squadron, designated the 22d Reconnaissance Squadron (Bombardment) from April 1943 to August 1943.
- The 622d Expeditionary Air Refueling Squadron, designated the 22d Reconnaissance Squadron, Photographic from October 1947 to June 1949.
- The 22d Attack Squadron, designated the 22d Reconnaissance Squadron from September 2012 to May 2015.

== See also ==
- The 22d Photographic Reconnaissance Squadron
- The 22d Tactical Reconnaissance Squadron
