= Boeing B-54 =

Bomber aircraft project by Boeing

B-54
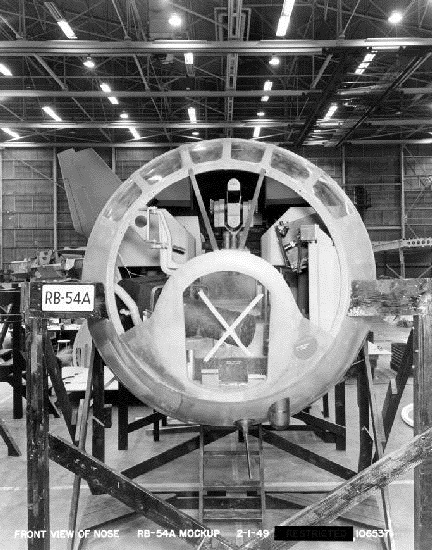
- Mockup of the B-54

General information
- Type: Strategic bomber
- National origin: United States
- Manufacturer: Boeing
- Status: Canceled
- Primary user: United States Air Force (intended)
- Number built: 0

History
- Developed from: B-50 Superfortress

The Boeing B-54 was an American strategic bomber project designed by Boeing for use by the United States Air Force. Derived from the B-50 Superfortress, it developed from the planned YB-50C prototype. The YB-50C was cancelled before completion, and no B-54 aircraft were built.

== Design and development ==
The B-54 began as the B-50C, an advanced development of the B-50 intended to extract the maximum possible performance from the basic Superfortress design. An early B-50A was set aside as the YB-50C prototype, and the B-50C mockup was completed by November 1948. In late 1948, the Air Force concluded that the B-50C differed enough from the earlier B-50A and B-50B to warrant a new bomber designation, B-54.

The standard Pratt & Whitney R-4360 engines of the B-50 were to be replaced with externally supercharged R-4360-43 Variable Discharge Turbine (VDT) engines, rated at 4,300 horsepower (3,200 kW) each for the YB-50C and B-54. The change required a major airframe redesign, including a wider wing and a longer fuselage to carry the additional loads imposed by the new wing. Additional outrigger landing gear was required to stabilize the aircraft on the ground.

The takeoff weight of the B-50C/B-54 was estimated at 230,000 pounds (100,000 kg), roughly 50,000 pounds (23,000 kg) greater than most other B-50s. The design was expected to reach a maximum speed of 430 miles per hour (690 km/h) and a range of 9,000 miles (14,000 km).

Forty-three production aircraft were ordered: 14 B-50C bombers and 29 RB-50C reconnaissance aircraft, later redesignated B-54A and RB-54A respectively. A Boeing production-list compilation identifies the cancelled B-54A serial block as 49-1757 through 49-1770 and the cancelled RB-54A block as 49-1771 through 49-1799.

The B-54 program was reviewed during a period of fiscal pressure in 1949. The design offered little remaining growth potential, would have been expensive to introduce, and its outrigger landing gear would have required wider taxiways and base reconstruction. Jet engines also could not be added to the design without a complete wing redesign. General Curtis LeMay opposed the B-54 and argued for cancellation in favor of additional B-36 bombers and accelerated B-47 production. The Board of Senior Officers recommended cancelling the B-54, and the recommendation was approved on 5 April 1949. The partially built YB-50C was also cancelled.

== Variants ==
B-54A
Bomber production version, originally ordered as the B-50C.
RB-54A
Reconnaissance production version, originally ordered as the RB-50C.

== Specifications ==
Data from Baugher, except engine designation and rating from White and the Pratt & Whitney development history.

General characteristics

- Length: 111 ft 0 in (33.83 m) planned
- Wingspan: 161 ft 2 in (49.12 m) planned; approximately 20 feet (6.1 m) greater than the B-50
- Max takeoff weight: 230,000 lb (104,326 kg) estimated
- Additional outrigger landing gear was required to stabilize the aircraft on the ground.
- Powerplant: 4 × Pratt & Whitney R-4360-43 VDT radial piston engine, 4,300 hp (3,200 kW) each

Performance

- Maximum speed: 430 mph (690 km/h, 370 kn) planned
- Range: 9,000 mi (14,000 km, 7,800 nmi) planned

== See also ==
Related development

- Boeing B-29 Superfortress
- Boeing XB-39 Superfortress
- Boeing B-50 Superfortress

Aircraft of comparable role, configuration, and era

- Convair B-36
- Tupolev Tu-85

Related lists

- List of bomber aircraft
- List of military aircraft of the United States
