= 431st Air Refueling Squadron =

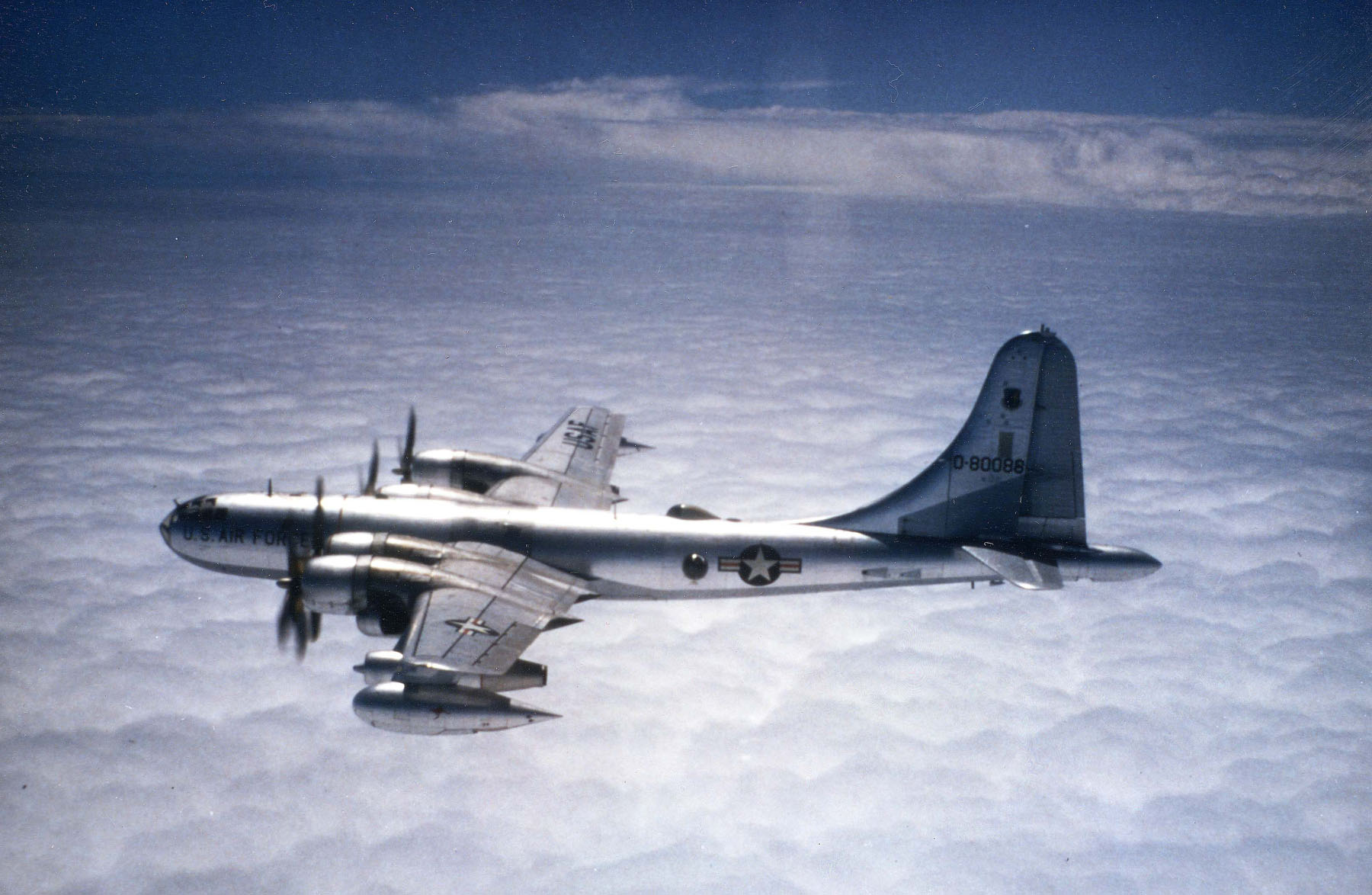
- Boeing KB-50J
- Active: 1957–1965
- Country: United States
- Branch: United States Air Force
- Role: Air refueling

Insignia
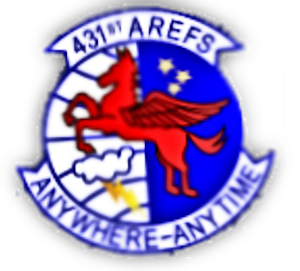
- 431st Air Refueling Squadron Emblem (approved 24 May 1957)

The 431st Air Refueling Squadron is an inactive United States Air Force unit. It was last assigned to the 4440th Aircraft Delivery Group at Biggs Air Force Base, Texas, where it was inactivated on 8 March 1965. From 1957 to 1965, it operated modified Superfortress bombers to refuel tactical Fighter, reconnaissance, and light bomber aircraft.

== History ==
The 431st Air Refueling Squadron was established at Turner Air Force Base in April 1957 by Tactical Air Command (TAC) to provide a dedicated air refueling capability, initially for North American F-100 Super Sabres, and later for other in-flight refueling capable TAC bombers, fighters and reconnaissance aircraft. The squadron was briefly equipped on activation with Boeing KB-29M Stratofortresses transferred from Strategic Air Command's 508th Air Refueling Squadron, formerly assigned to the 31st Strategic Fighter Wing, which was inactivated at Turner in July. These aircraft were bombers converted to tankers using a British-developed hose refueling system.

The 431st re-equipped in June 1957 with the Boeing KB-50 Superfortress, which provided greater speed to refuel jet aircraft. KB-50s were modified about 1960 to KB-50J configuration which added a J-47 turbojet engine underneath each wing in place of the auxiliary fuel tanks to increase the speed of the aircraft. In 1958, TAC placed its refueling units under the 4505th Air Refueling Wing, which was located at Langley Air Force Base, Virginia. In 1959, the squadron moved to Biggs Air Force Base, Texas.

By 1964 the unit's aircraft were being phased out due to age. They were being replaced by Strategic Air Command's Boeing KC-97 Stratofreighters and Boeing KC-135 Stratotankers The squadron inactivated in March 1965 and its KB-50Js were sent to the Military Aircraft Storage and Disposition Center at Davis–Monthan Air Force Base, Arizona. When it inactivated the squadron was the last USAF KB-50 unit.

=== Lineage ===
- Constituted as the 431st Air Refueling Squadron, Fighter-Bomber on 8 January 1957

Activated on 1 April 1957
Redesignated 431st Air Refueling Squadron, Tactical on 1 July 1958
Inactivated on 8 March 1965

=== Assignments ===
- Ninth Air Force, 1 April 1957 (attached to 31st Fighter-Bomber Wing)
- 31st Fighter-Bomber Wing, 1 November 1957
- 4505th Air Refueling Wing, 1 July 1958
- 4440th Aircraft Delivery Group, 8 October 1963 – 8 March 1965

=== Stations ===
- Turner Air Force Base, Georgia, 1 April 1957
- Biggs Air Force Base, Texas, 18 July 1959 – 8 March 1965

=== Aircraft ===
- Boeing KB-29M Superfortress, 1957
- Boeing KB-50J Superfortress, 1957–1965
