= 622d Expeditionary Air Refueling Squadron =

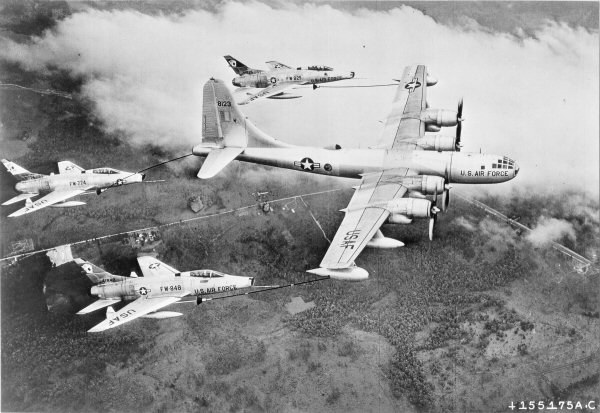
- A squadron Boeing KB-50D Superfortress carrying out the first triple-point refueling operation (Note: The receiver aircraft are North American F-100C Super Sabres of the 451st Fighter-Day Squadron. Taken in 1956.)
- Active: 1942-1945; 1947-1949; 1955-1964; 2000–2004
- Country: United States
- Branch: United States Air Force
- Role: Air Refueling
- Engagements: European Theater of Operations
- Decorations: Distinguished Unit Citation; Air Force Outstanding Unit Award; French Croix de Guerre with Palm

Insignia
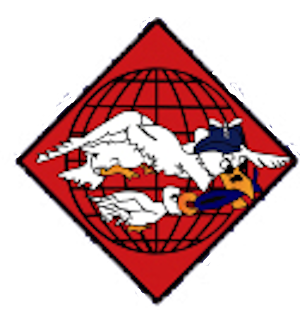
- 622d Air Refueling Squadron emblem (approved 15 June 1956)

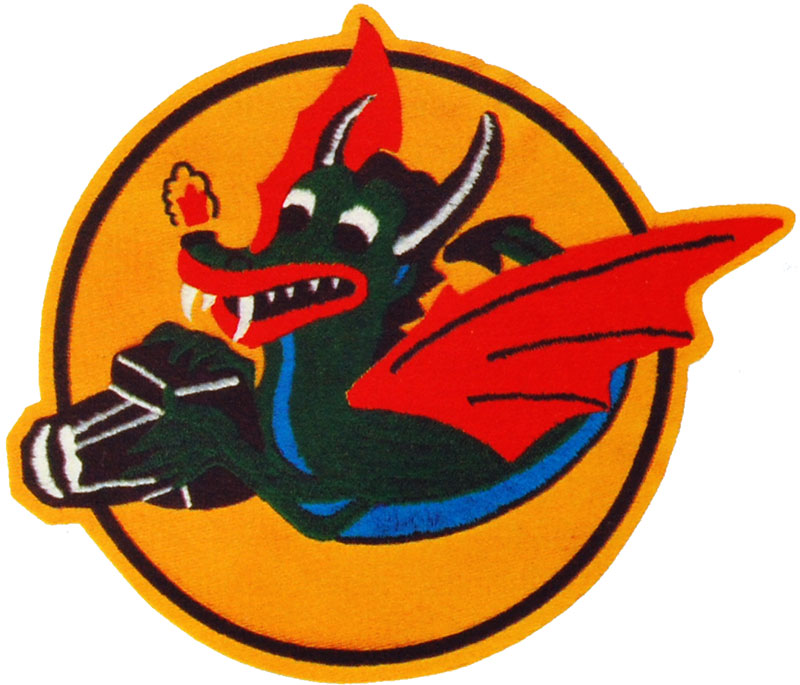
- 22d Photographic Reconnaissance Squadron emblem

The 622d Expeditionary Air Refueling Squadron is a provisional United States Air Force unit, assigned to United States Air Forces Europe to activate or inactivate as needed. The squadron was first established during World War II as the 22d Photographic Reconnaissance Squadron. It served in the European Theater of Operations, where it earned a Distinguished Unit Citation and a French Croix de Guerre with Palm for its actions in combat.

The unit was again active in the reserve as the 22d Reconnaissance Squadron from 1947 to 1949 but apparently was not equipped with its own aircraft. In 1985 the squadron was consolidated with the 622d Air Refueling Squadron.

The 622d Air Refueling Squadron served with Tactical Air Command at England Air Force Base, Louisiana from July 1955 until April 1964, refueling tactical fighters and other tactical aircraft. It was converted to provisional status in 2000 and operated from Istres le Tube Airfield.

== History ==
=== World War II ===
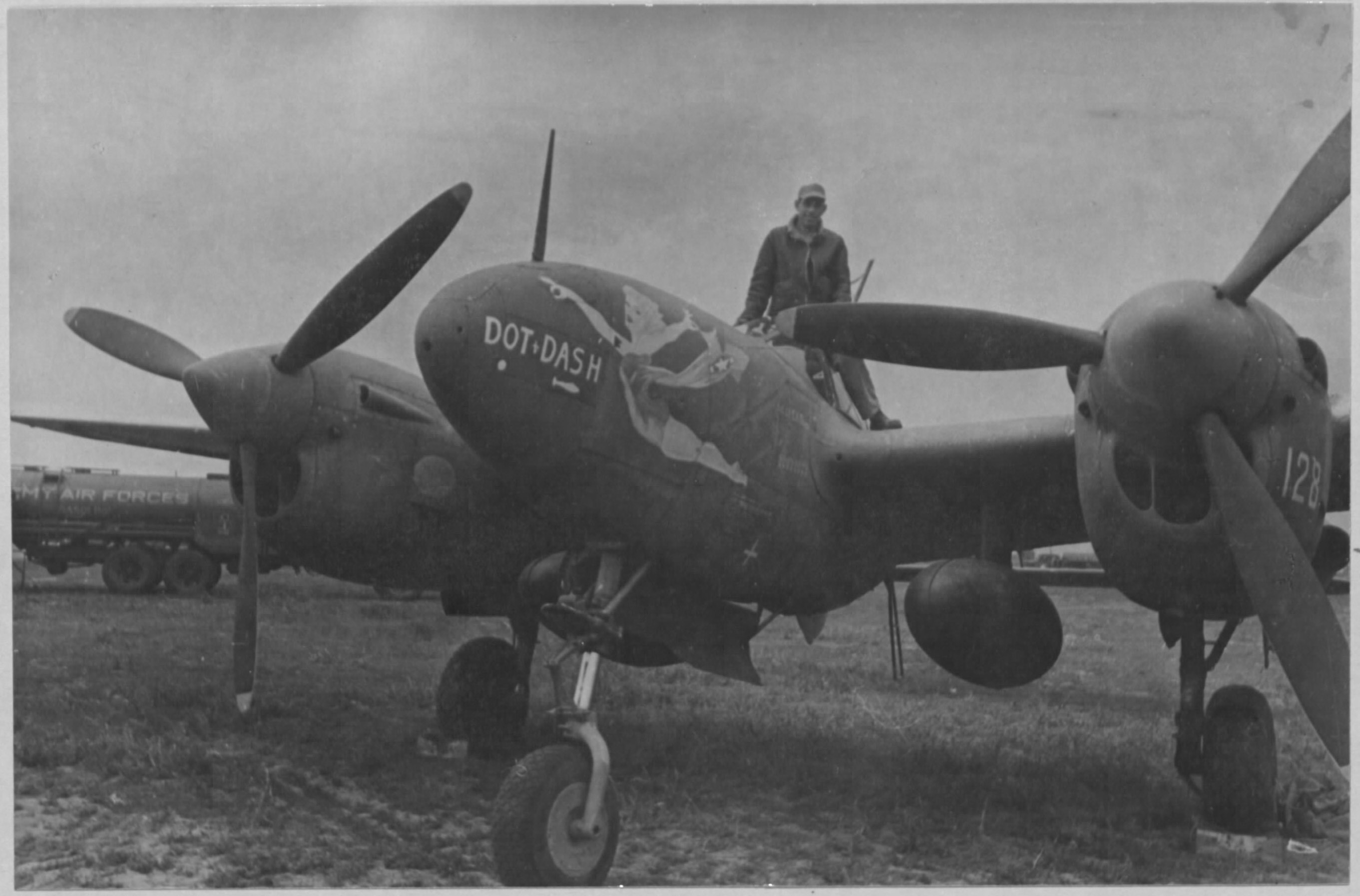
F-5C Lightning 'Dot And Dash' after landing on a shuttle flight to Russia in 1944 (Note: This aircraft was shot down 6 October 1944 over IJsselmeer, Netherlands, while assigned to the 22d. "Missing Air Crew Reports". Records of the Office of the Quartermaster General Record Group 92. 6 October 1944. "F5 42-67128")

The first predecessor of the squadron was activated at Peterson Field, Colorado in September 1942 as the 22d Photographic Reconnaissance Squadron, a component of the 5th Photographic Group. The outfit existed essentially on paper until 21 December 1943 when 12 officers and 129 enlisted men were transferred from the 10th Photographic Reconnaissance Squadron. After training, the unit left Colorado Springs on 17 May 1943 and traveled to England aboard the RMS Queen Mary. There it served as a photographic reconnaissance unit until the end of the war.

The squadron arrived at the RAF Mount Farm airfield on 8 June 1943. The unit was equipped with Lockheed F-5 Lightning photographic aircraft and its first mission was flown on 24 June 1943. The 22d Photographic Squadron, along with the 13th and 14th Photographic Squadrons into the on 7 July 1943, when the 7th Photographic Reconnaissance and Mapping Group transferred to England on paper. In 1943, the 22d was among the squadrons flying the first photo reconnaissance missions against Peenemünde.

It received a Distinguished Unit Citation for its coverage of bridges, marshalling yards, canals, highways, and other targets that contributed to the success of the Normandy Campaign. It provided reconnaissance support for the Battle of the Bulge and the Rhine crossings. Its work was also recognized by the French, who awarded the unit the French Croix de Guerre with Palm.

=== Air Force Reserve ===
The squadron was redesignated as the 22d Reconnaissance Squadron in 1947 and activated the reserve. It apparently was not fully equipped and was inactivated in the summer of 1949 when Continental Air Command adopted the wing base organization for its reserve units.

=== Tactical Air Command ===
The 622d Air Refueling Squadron was established at Alexandria Air Force Base, Louisiana in 1955 to provide dedicated air refueling, initially for North American F-100 Super Sabres and later for other in-flight refueling capable Tactical Air Command fighters, fighter bombers, and reconnaissance aircraft. The squadron was initially equipped with transferred Strategic Air Command Boeing KB-29M Superfortresses that were converted to aerial tankers using a British-developed probe and drogue refueling system.

The squadron re-equipped with Boeing KB-50 Superfortress tankers in 1957 which provided greater speed to refuel jet aircraft. KB-50s were modified about 1960 to the KB-50J configuration, which added a General Electric J47 turbojet engine underneath each wing in place of the auxiliary fuel tanks in order to increase the speed of the aircraft while conducting air refueling operations.

By 1963 aircraft were phased out due to age. SAC, with KC-97s and KC-135s became the Air Force's single manager for air refueling. The squadron inactivated in early 1964 when KB-50Js sent to Aerospace Maintenance and Regeneration Center at Davis-Monthan Air Force Base, Arizona.

=== Recent operations ===
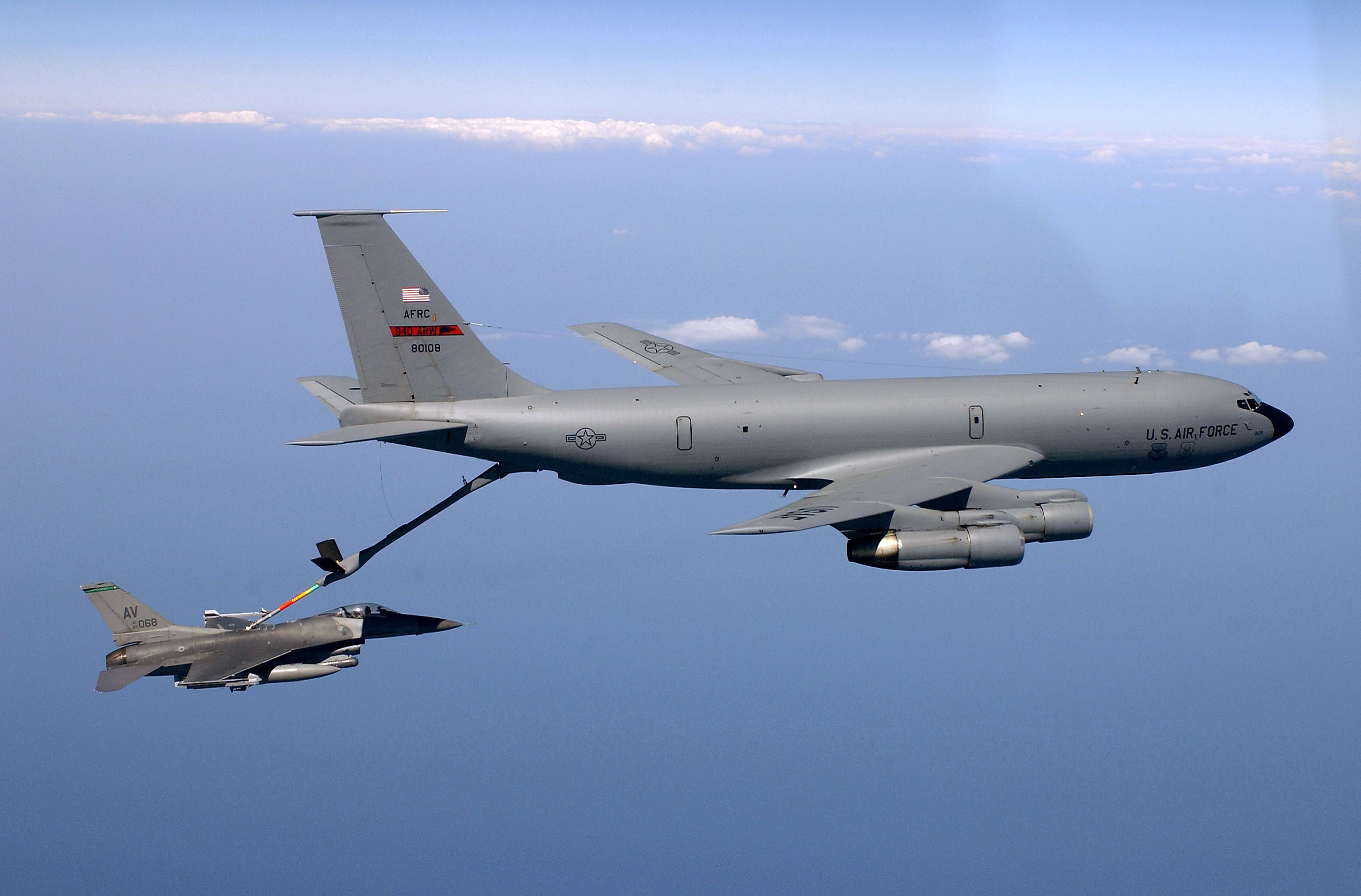
A squadron KC-135E refuels a F-16C Fighting Falcon over the Adriatic. The tanker was deployed from the 940th Air Refueling Wing and the receiver was assigned to the 555th Fighter Squadron.

The consolidated squadron was converted to provisional status and redesignated the 622d Expeditionary Air Refueling Squadron. It operated from Istres le Tube in France from 2000 to 2004, providing air refueling to aircraft supporting the NATO Stabilisation Force in Bosnia and Herzegovina, Operation Joint Forge.

== Lineage ==
22d Reconnaissance Squadron

- Constituted as the 22d Photographic Reconnaissance Squadron on 14 July 1942

Activated on 2 September 1942
Redesignated 22d Photographic Squadron on 6 February 1943
Redesignated 22d Photographic Reconnaissance Squadron on 13 November 1943
Inactivated on 16 December 1945
Redesignated 22d Reconnaissance Squadron, Photographic on 11 March 1947

- Activated in the reserve on 23 October 1947

Inactivated on 27 June 1949
Consolidated with the 622d Air Refueling Squadron as the 622d Air Refueling Squadron on 19 September 1985 (remained inactive)

622d Air Refueling Squadron

- Constituted as the 622d Air Refueling Squadron, Fighter-Bomber on 1 July 1955

Activated on 18 July 1955
Redesignated 622d Air Refueling Squadron, Tactical on 1 July 1958
Inactivated on 1 April 1964

- Consolidated with the 22d Reconnaissance Squadron as the 622d Air Refueling Squadron, Heavy on 19 September 1985 (remained inactive)
- Converted to provisional status and redesignated 622d Expeditionary Air Refueling Squadron on 7 July 2000

Activated on 24 July 2000
Inactivated on 22 December 2004

=== Assignments ===
- 5th Photographic Group (later 5th Photographic Reconnaissance and Mapping Group): 2 September 1942 (attached to Eighth Air Force after 8 June 1943)
- 7th Photographic Reconnaissance and Mapping Group (later 7th Photographic Group, 7th Reconnaissance Group): 7 July 1943 – 21 November 1945
- 74th Reconnaissance Group: 23 October 1947 - 27 June 1949
- Ninth Air Force: 1 July 1955 (attached to 366th Fighter-Bomber Wing)
- Eighteenth Air Force: 1 October 1957 (attached to 366th Fighter-Bomber Wing)
- Twelfth Air Force: 1 January 1958 (attached to 366th Fighter-Bomber Wing until 1 July 1958)
- 4505th Air Refueling Wing: 18 July 1958
- 4440th Aircraft Delivery Group: 8 October 1963 – 1 April 1964 (nonoperational)
- 16th Expeditionary Operations Group 24 July 2000 – 22 December 2004

=== Stations ===
- Peterson Field, Colorado, 2 September 1942 – 17 May 1943
- RAF Mount Farm, England, 8 June 1943 (detachment operated from Attlebridge, England, 14 February - ca. 6 March 1944)
- RAF Chalgrove, England, 26 March 1945
- Villacoublay Airfield, France, c. 14 October 1945 - ca. 5 December 1945
- Camp Kilmer, New Jersey, 15 December 1945 – 15 December 1945
- Stewart Field, New York, 23 October 1947
- Stamford, Connecticut, 5 March 1948 - 27 June 1949
- Alexandria Air Force Base (later England Air Force Base), Louisiana, 18 July 1955 – 1 April 1964
- Istres-Le Tubé Air Base, 24 July 2000 - 22 December 2004

=== Aircraft ===
- Lockheed P-38 Lightning, 1943–1945
- Lockheed F-5 Lightning, 1943–1945
- Supermarine Spitfire, 1943–1945
- North American P-51 Mustang, 1945
- Boeing KB-29M Superfortress, 1955-1957
- Boeing KB-50 Superfortress, 1957-1963
- Boeing KC-135 Stratotanker, 2003-2004

=== Awards and campaigns ===
Award streamer	Award	Dates	Notes
	Distinguished Unit Citation	31 May 1944 - 30 June 1944	France 22d Photographic Reconnaissance Squadron
	French Croix de Guerre with Palm	1944	22d Photographic Reconnaissance Squadron
	Air Force Outstanding Unit Award	1 October 2000-30 September 2002	622d Expeditionary Air Refueling Squadron

Campaign Streamer	Campaign	Dates	Notes
	Air Offensive, Europe	8 June 1943 – 5 June 1944	22d Photographic Squadron (later 22d Photographic Reconnaissance Squadron)
	Air Combat, EAME Theater	8 June 1943 – 11 May 1945	22d Photographic Squadron (later 22d Photographic Reconnaissance Squadron)
	Normandy	6 June 1944 – 24 July 1944	22d Photographic Reconnaissance Squadron
	Northern France	25 July 1944 – 14 September 1944	22d Photographic Reconnaissance Squadron
	Rhineland	15 September 1944 – 21 March 1945	22d Photographic Reconnaissance Squadron
	Ardennes-Alsace	16 December 1944 – 25 January 1945	22d Photographic Reconnaissance Squadron
	Central Europe	22 March 1944 – 21 May 1945	22d Photographic Reconnaissance Squadron
