= 4505th Air Refueling Wing =

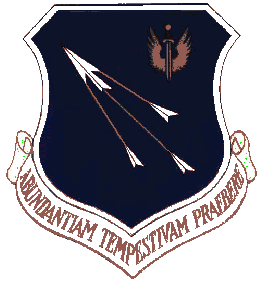
- 4505th Air Refueling Wing emblem
- Active: 1958–1963
- Country: United States
- Branch: United States Air Force
- Role: Air Refueling
- Garrison/HQ: Langley AFB, Virginia

The United States Air Force's 4505th Air Refueling Wing (Tactical) was an Air Refueling unit located at Langley AFB, Virginia. It was established on 1 Jul 1958 at Langley AFB, Virginia. The 4505th was the only aerial refueling wing in the Tactical Air Command structure. The wing flew the KB-50J, a derivative of the B-50 nuclear bomber. The 4505th Air Refueling Wing (Tactical) was discontinued on 8 Oct 1963.

== Assignments ==
=== Major command ===
- Tactical Air Command (1 Jul 1958 – 8 Oct 1963)

=== Numbered Air Force ===
- (1 Jul 58 – 8 Oct 63)

=== Air division ===
- (1 Jul 58 – 8 Oct 63)

== Previous designations ==
- 4505th Air Refueling Wing, Tactical (1 Jul 1958 – 8 Oct 1963)

== Units ==
- 4440th Aircraft Delivery Group, 1 July 1961 – 8 October 1963
- 427th Air Refueling Squadron – Robins AFB, Georgia (1 Jul 1958 – 8 Oct 1963)
- 429th Air Refueling Squadron – Langley AFB, Virginia (1 Jul 1958 – 8 Oct 1963)
- 431st Air Refueling Squadron – Turner AFB, Georgia (1 Jul 1958 – 8 Oct 1963)
- 622d Air Refueling Squadron – England AFB, Louisiana (1 Jul 1958 – 8 Oct 1963)
