= 429th Air Refueling Squadron =

Inactive US Air Force unit

429th Air Refueling Squadron

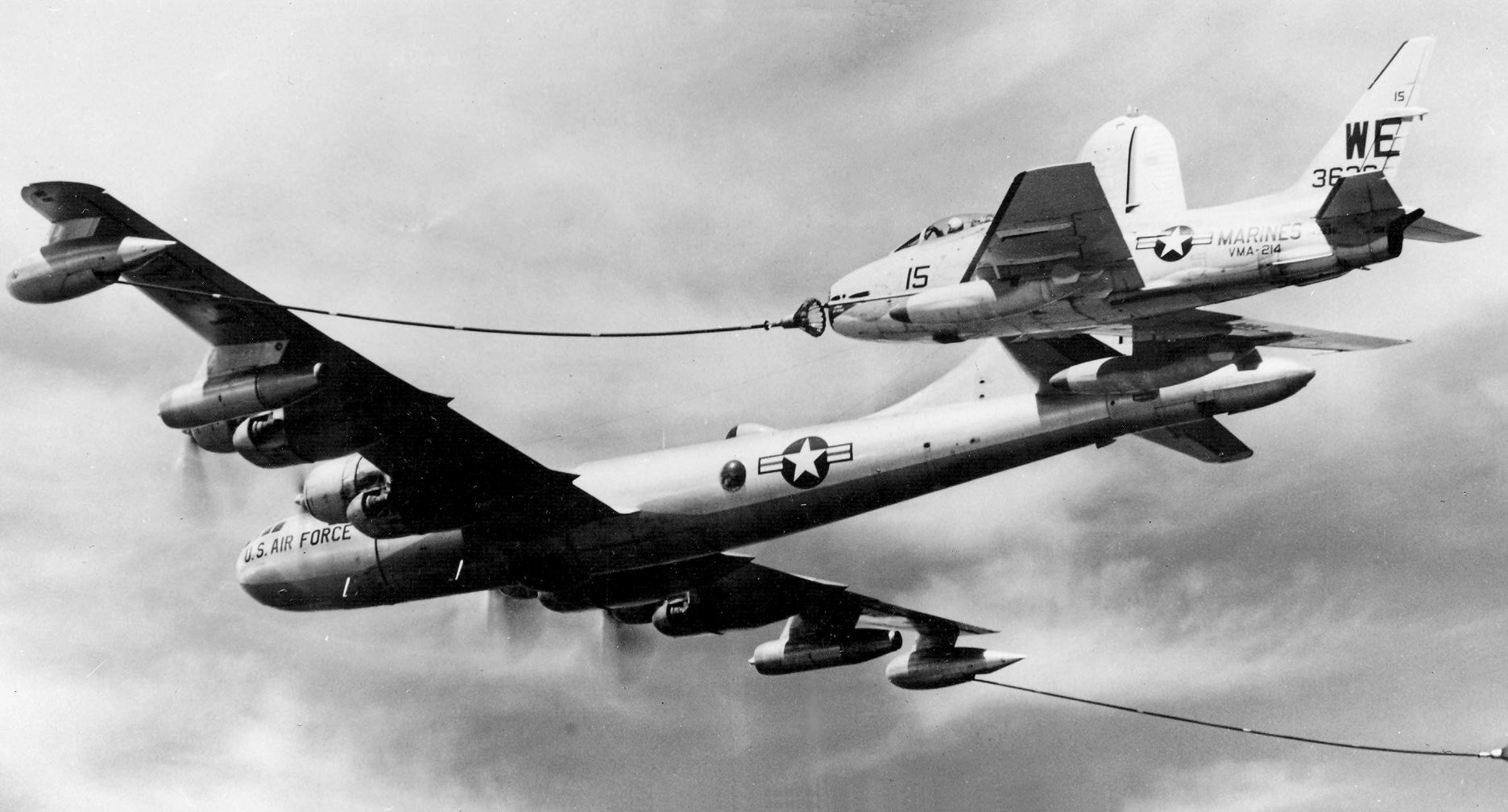
- KB-50J Refueling a Marine FJ-4B
- Active: 1954–1963
- Country: United States
- Branch: United States Air Force
- Type: Aerial refueling

Insignia
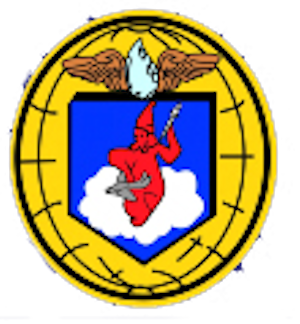
- Emblem of the 429th Air Refueling Squadron Emblem Approved 1 December 1955

The 429th Air Refueling Squadron is an inactive United States Air Force unit. It was last assigned to the 4505th Air Refueling Wing at Langley Air Force Base, Virginia, where it was inactivated on 8 October 1963.

== History ==
The squadron was activated in 1954 by Tactical Air Command (TAC) to provide a dedicated air refueling capability, initially for F-100 Super Sabres and later for other air refueling capable TAC fighter and fighter bombers. The 429th was initially equipped with Boeing KB-29M Superfortresses, modified bombers equipped with a British-developed hose air refueling systems and transferred from Strategic Air Command (SAC).

The 429th retired its KB-29s by November 1957, and was fully equipped with Boeing KB-50 tankers by the end of the year. These were existing B-50A, B-50D or RB-50 aircraft, with armament removed and equipped with a probe and drogue refueling system installed by Hayes Aircraft Corporation and capable of refueling three fighters at the same time. Even before the change to KB-50s was complete, in September 1957, the 429th sent the first KB-50 in the Air Force to be modified to KB-50J configuration. These tankers added a General Electric J47 turbojet engine underneath each wing to increase the speed and altitude capability of the aircraft.

The unit's KB-50Js proved difficult to maintain to meet operational commitments, and modification of the aircraft to improve them would not be economical in view of their expected service life. Although TAC wanted to replace them with Boeing KC-135 Stratotankers, in 1960 the Air Force announced that Strategic Air Command (SAC) would become the Air Force's single manager for air refueling. TAC's KB-50s would be phased out by 1964, while SAC would acquire additional KC-135s to support TAC. In October 1963, the 429th inactivated, and its KB-50Js were sent to the Military Aircraft Storage and Disposition Center at Davis–Monthan Air Force Base, Arizona.

=== Lineage ===
- Constituted as the 429th Air Refueling Squadron, Fighter-Bomber on 1 July 1954

Activated on 19 July 1954
Redesignated as 429th Air Refueling Squadron, Tactical on 1 July 1958
Discontinued and inactivated on 8 October 1963

- Consolidated on 19 September 1985 with the 129th Strategic Reconnaissance Squadron as the 969th Airborne Warning and Control Squadron (remained inactive)

=== Assignments ===
- Tactical Air Command, 19 July 1954 (attached to 405th Fighter-Bomber Wing)
- Ninth Air Force, 1954 (remained attached to 405th Fighter-Bomber Wing)
- 4505th Air Refueling Wing, 1 July 1958 – 8 October 1963

=== Stations ===
- Langley AFB, Virginia, 19 July 1954 – 8 October 1963

=== Aircraft ===
- Boeing KB-29M Superfortress, 1954–1957
- Boeing KB-50 Superfortress, 1957–1958
- Boeing KB-50J Superfortress, 1958–1963
