= 4440th Aircraft Delivery Group =

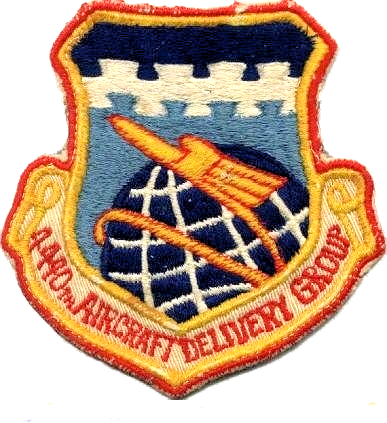
- Emblem of the 4440th Aircraft Delivery Group
- Active: 1958–1969
- Country: United States
- Branch: United States Air Force

The 4440th Aircraft Delivery Group is an inactive United States Air Force unit. Its last assignment was to Headquarters, Tactical Air Command, based at Langley Air Force Base, Virginia. It was inactivated on 15 October 1969.

== Mission ==
The group planned, surveyed and exercised operational control of all aircraft movements; and controlled obligation and liquidation of all funds allocated for expenditure in connection with ferrying missions. Every type and designation of aircraft not assigned to a specific unit was ferried from one unit assignment to another by this organization, 1951–1969.

== History ==
Missions of the unit included the movement of all Jet Fighters from the United States (F-84F, F-84G, F-86F, T-33) over the North Atlantic Transport Route to United States Air Forces in Europe (USAFE) units and Mutual Defense Assistance Program (MDAP) Recipients in 1953.

It also conducted transfers of F-47 Thunderbolt aircraft from Texas to Central and South American countries under MDAP in 1953; B-57 Canberra aircraft to Far East Air Force in Japan, 4 November 1955.

From Hq TAC at Langley AFB in Virginia, controllers in the command post of the 4440th Aircraft Delivery Group monitored and directed ferry movements of Air Force aircraft. Intercommand transfer, flights to overhaul, delivery of military aircraft to foreign governments - all were missions of the 4440th. Aircraft delivered were F-100D/F, KB-50J, F-84F, C-130, SA-16, B-66, C-54, C-119C/G, C-47 and B-57.

In early 1960s, assumed control of 431st Air Refueling Squadron after inactivation of 4505th ARW with KB-50 Tankers. The squadron was inactivated in March 1965. Primary mission during the 1960s was movement of aircraft to South Vietnam and Thailand bases to support Vietnam War. Delivered F-4 Phantom II, F-100 Super Sabre, F-105 Thunderchief, A-37 Dragonfly and various Forward Air Controller O-2 and OV-10 aircraft. Delivered F-4 Phantom II to NATO as well as F-111 and F-105 aircraft.

Flew numerous MDAP aircraft from the United States to Howard AFB, Panama Canal Zone. Unit inactivated in October 1969.

=== Lineage ===
- Designated by TAC as the 4440th Aircraft Delivery Group on 1 January 1958
- Organized on 15 January 1958

Inactivated on 15 October 1969

=== Assignments ===
- Tactical Air Command, 15 Jan 1958
- Ninth Air Force, 1 Apr 1958
- 836th Air Division, 1 Feb 1959
- 4505th Air Refueling Wing, 1 Jul 1961
- Tactical Air Command, 8 Oct 1963 – 15 Oct 1969

=== Units ===
- 431st Air Refueling Squadron, 8 Oct 1963 – 8 Mar 1965 (KB-50s)

=== Stations ===
- Westover AFB, Massachusetts, 16 July 1951
- Kelly AFB, Texas, 1 December 1955
- Langley AFB, Virginia, 15 January 1958 – 15 October 1969
