= Tactical Air Command =

Inactive US Air Force command

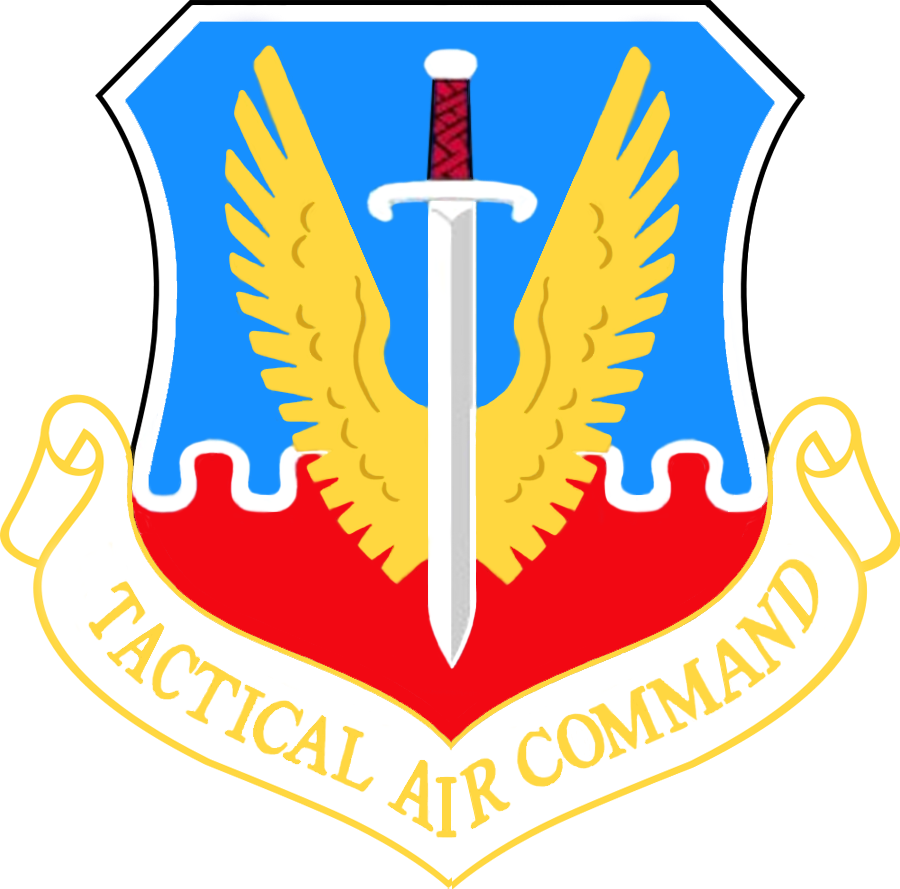
- Tactical Air Command emblem
- Active: 21 March 1946 – 1 June 1992
- Country: United States of America
- Branch: United States Army Air Forces (21 March 1946 – 18 September 1947); United States Air Force (18 September 1947 – 1 June 1992)
- Type: Major Command
- Garrison/HQ: Langley Air Force Base

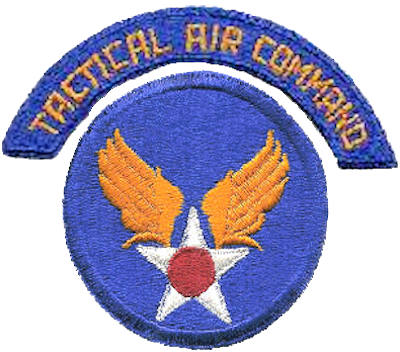
1946 USAAF Tactical Air Command shoulder patch

Tactical Air Command (TAC) is an inactive United States Air Force organization. It was a major command of the United States Air Force, established on 21 March 1946 and headquartered at Langley Air Force Base, Virginia. It was inactivated on 1 June 1992 and its personnel and equipment absorbed by Air Combat Command (ACC).

Tactical Air Command was established to provide a balance between strategic, air defense, and tactical forces of the post–World War II U.S. Army Air Forces followed by, in 1947, the U.S. Air Force. In 1948, the Continental Air Command assumed control over air defense, tactical air, and air reserve forces. After two years in a subordinate role, Tactical Air Command (TAC) was established as a major command.

In 1992, after assessing the mission of TAC and to accommodate a decision made regarding Strategic Air Command (SAC), Headquarters United States Air Force deactivated TAC and incorporated its resources into the newly created ACC.

== History ==
=== Operational history ===
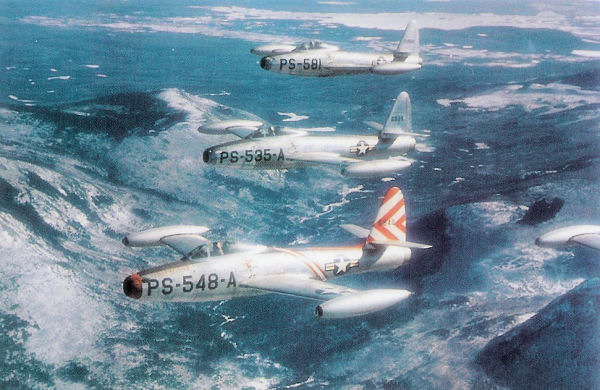
Republic F-84B-21-RE Thunderjets of the 14th Fighter Group, Dow AFB, Maine, 1948. Visible AF serial numbers are 46–0548, 46–0535 and 46-0581.

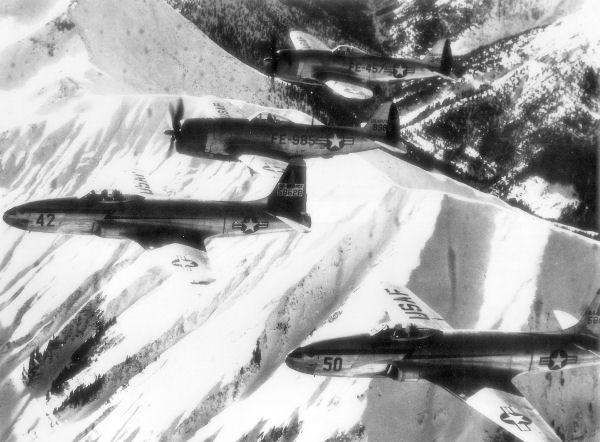
F-80s and F-47s of the 36th Fighter and 86th Composite Groups over Germany, 1948.

World War II showed the effectiveness of tactical air power in supporting army ground forces. However, the rapid demobilization in late 1945 meant that the huge air armada that had brought Germany to her knees and victory in Europe had been downsized to a shadow of its former self.

Following the end of World War II, Headquarters United States Army Air Forces (USAAF) had little funding and most wartime personnel had been released from active duty and returned to civilian life. Many USAAF aircraft were being sent to storage or scrapyards, although the increasing tension with the Soviet Union meant that combat military air forces were still needed. The big questions were how large and what kind of forces.

A major realignment of the USAAF was undertaken in early 1946. As part of the realignment, three major command divisions within the Continental United States (CONUS) were formed: Strategic Air Command, Tactical Air Command, and Air Defense Command. Each was given a specific responsibility, using assets prescribed to accomplish the assigned mission. Tactical Air Command was formed to command, organize, equip, train and administer assigned or attached forces. It was to plan for and participate in tactics for fighter, light bombardment and other aircraft. These included tactical fighters, tactical bombers, tactical missiles, troop carrier aircraft, assault, reconnaissance, and support units. TAC also planned for and developed the capability to deploy tactical striking forces anywhere in the world.

During its existence, Tactical Air Command deployed personnel, material and/or aircraft to Asia (both Pacific Rim/Southeast Asia and Southwest Asia/Middle East), Africa, North America, South America, Europe and Australia in support of its prescribed mission.

TAC's original authorization was 25,500 officers and enlisted men. Aircraft assets available consisted of propeller-driven North American P-51 Mustangs, Republic P-47 Thunderbolts and a handful of the new jet-powered Lockheed P-80 Shooting Stars. TAC was also given control of the Third Air Force, Ninth Air Force and Twelfth Air Force.

==== Berlin Airlift ====
On 18 September 1947, the United States Air Force was established as a separate military force, with TAC as one of its major commands. Six months later, in March 1948, the first test of the United States' resolve began with the blockade of Berlin by the Soviet Union and the need for tactical air power in Europe to underscore the airlift mission was necessary.

At the time, there was only one U.S. Air Forces in Europe (USAFE) tactical air unit available in Europe, the 86th Composite Group at Neubiberg Air Base near Munich, flying P-47Ds. TAC was called upon to send additional units and aircraft to Europe to reinforce the 86 FG. The 36th Fighter Group, flying Lockheed F-80B "Shooting Stars," was transferred from Howard AFB in the Panama Canal Zone to Fürstenfeldbruck Air Base near Munich. In addition to tactical fighter aircraft, TAC also deployed available C-47 Skytrain transports to Europe, transferring them to USAFE, which was in control of the airlift. As the airlift continued, TAC also transferred available C-54 Skymaster transports to Europe, where they were assigned to the troop carrier groups that had been sent to Germany for the airlift.

Consequently, the Soviet Union entered into negotiations with the United States, the United Kingdom and France which culminated in an agreement, signed on 5 May 1949, that resulted in the lifting of the blockade, but it did not settle the basic issue of freedom of access. Despite the resumption of surface traffic into the city, the airlift continued until 30 September to mass a reserve of food, fuel, and other supplies in the event the Soviets reimposed the blockade.

==== Continental Air Command ====
In December 1948, Air Defense Command (ADC) and TAC were brought together to form Continental Air Command (ConAC). HQ TAC was reduced to the status of an operational headquarters under CONAC. This move reflected an effort to concentrate all fighter forces deployed within the continental United States (CONUS) to strengthen the air defense of the North American continent. The creation of ConAC was largely an administrative convenience: the units assigned to ConAC were dual-trained and expected to revert to their primary strategic or tactical roles after the air defense battle was won. Two years later, on 1 December 1950, the Air Force reestablished Tactical Air Command as a major command and removed it from assignment to ConAC in large part due to the need to deploy personnel and aircraft to Japan and South Korea due to the Korean War.

=== Korean War ===
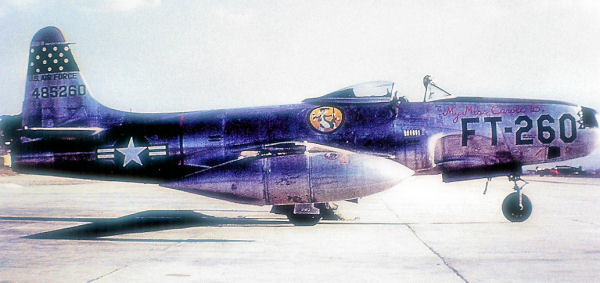
Lockheed RF-80A-15-LO Shooting Star, AF Ser. No. 44-85260, of the 67th Tactical Reconnaissance Group.

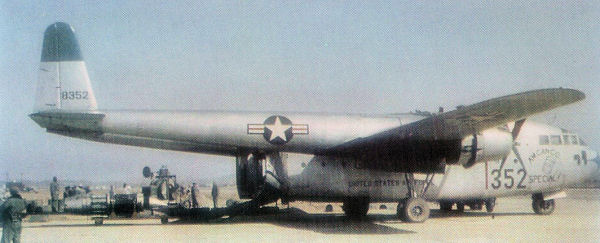
Fairchild C-119B Flying Boxcar, AF Ser. No 48-352, of the 314th Troop Carrier Group.

On the morning of 25 June 1950, the peace in South Korea was shattered by the sound of invading tanks. The North Korean army had crossed the 38th parallel and were driving south towards the South Korean capital of Seoul in an effort to unite the country under Communist rule. The United States Air Force, weakened by post-World War II demobilization, associated budget reductions, and preoccupied with the threat of the Soviet Union, was thrust into its first war as a separate service when North Korea invaded South Korea.

Air bases in the United States went on mobility alert to prepare for overseas movement in response to what was then described as the "Korean Emergency." Units from SAC and CONAC were deployed to Japan and South Korea, while Air Force Reserve and Air National Guard units were recalled to active duty and, in the case of the Air National Guard, placed under Federal Service in case they were needed. What started out as an emergency turned into a bona-fide war. The Korean War marked the creation of a professional Air Force that would grow in size and strength for decades to come.

From the start, the deployed tactical fighters and bombers to Japan and South Korea were effective. On 10 July a North Korean armored column was trapped at a bombed-out bridge near Pyongtaek. F-80 Shooting Stars, B-26 Invaders, and F-82 Twin Mustangs destroyed 117 trucks, 38 tanks, and seven half-tracks. This attack, along with others, gutted North Korea's single armored division. Had it survived, the North Korean force could have easily punched through the United Nations (UN) defensive line at Pusan and driven UN Command (UNC) forces into the sea.

By the end of August 1950, the initial North Korean onslaught was reversed and Seoul was retaken. As the United Nations forces advanced into North Korea, forces from the Communist China stepped in to help their North Korean allies. The UN advance ground to a halt in December, then retreated south in early 1951 while tactical aircraft continued to support of United Nations forces. Eventually, the line stabilized along the 38th Parallel, where a stalemate ensued for the next two years.

==== Known TAC units and aircraft deployed to Far East Air Forces (1950–1953) ====
Units and aircraft were stationed both in South Korea and Japan and attached to Fifth Air Force during their deployment to Far East Air Forces (FEAF). This list does not include ConAC, Air Force Reserve, or Air National Guard tactical air units federalized and deployed to FEAF during the Korean War.

- 4th Fighter-Interceptor Wing (F-86 Sabre)

Deployed from: New Castle Airport, Delaware

- 474th Fighter-Bomber Group Wing (F-84 Thunderjet)

Deployed from: Clovis AFB, New Mexico

- 452nd Bombardment Wing (Light) (B-26 Invader)

Deployed from: George AFB, California

- 67th Tactical Reconnaissance Wing (RF-80, RF-86, RB-26)

Deployed from: March AFB, California

- 314th Troop Carrier Wing (Medium) (C-119 Flying Boxcar)

Deployed from: Smyrna AFB, Tennessee

- 403rd Troop Carrier Wing (Medium) (C-119, C-47, C-54)

Portland Airport, Oregon

=== United States Air Forces in Europe (USAFE) ===
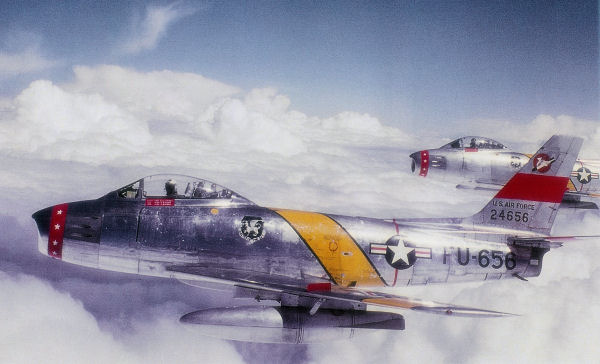
North American F-86F-30-NA Sabres of the 50th FBW flying over West Germany. AF Ser. No. 52-4656 is in front. The 50th was formed at Cannon Air Force Base, New Mexico in 1953, then transferred to Hahn Air Base, West Germany. The 50 FW was assigned to USAFE for nearly 40 years throughout the Cold War.

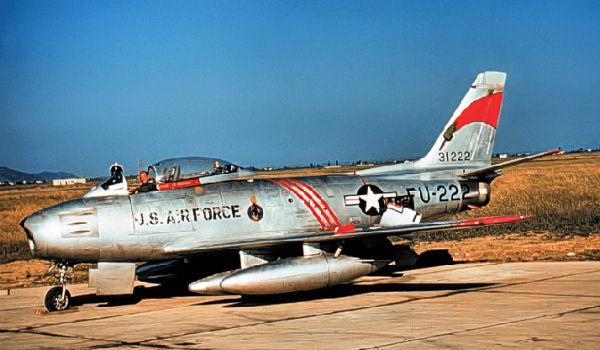
F-86F-35-NA, AF Ser. No. 53-1222 of the 49th Fighter-Bomber Wing, 1955

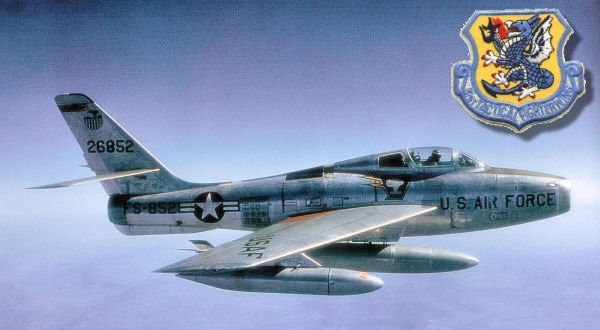
Republic F-84F-50-RE Thunderstreak, AF Ser. No. 52-6852 of the 81st Fighter-Bomber Wing, 91st Fighter-Bomber Squadron, c. 1955.

Even with the active war in Korea raging, in the early 1950s Europe received a higher priority of air power than Korea by the Truman Administration and the Department of Defense. Deterring the threat of a Communist takeover of Western Europe was considered more important to the long-term survival of the United States than a Communist victory in Korea.

In September 1950, NATO's Military Committee had called for an ambitious buildup of conventional forces to meet the Soviets, subsequently reaffirming this position at the February 1952 meeting of the Atlantic Council in Lisbon which had established a goal of ultimately fielding 96 divisions in the event of a conventional war in 1954. In support of this, the United States Air Forces in Europe (USAFE), which consisted of 16 wings totaling 2,100 aircraft, was programmed to expand to 28 wings, 22 of them in NATO's Central Region alone, backed by deployed Strategic Air Command units sent from CONUS.

The USAF reassigned combat wings from TAC to USAFE during the period from April 1951 through December 1954. These were:

- 81st Fighter-Interceptor Wing

Reassigned to: RAF Bentwaters, United Kingdom

- 47th Bombardment Wing, Light

Deployed to: RAF Sculthorpe, United Kingdom
(Remained assigned to TAC's 49th Air Division)

- 20th Fighter-Bomber Wing

Reassigned to: RAF Wethersfield, United Kingdom

- 406th Fighter-Bomber Wing

Reassigned to: RAF Manston, United Kingdom

- 66th Tactical Reconnaissance Wing

Reassigned to: Sembach Air Base, West Germany

- 10th Tactical Reconnaissance Wing

Reassigned to: Spangdahlem Air Base, West Germany

- 50th Fighter-Bomber Wing

Reassigned to: Hahn Air Base, West Germany

- 21st Fighter Bomber Wing

Reassigned to: Chambley-Bussieres Air Base, France

- 48th Fighter Bomber Wing

Activated at: Chaumont-Semoutiers Air Base, France
(Replaced ANG 137th Fighter-Bomber Wing)

- 388th Fighter Bomber Wing

Reassigned to: Etain-Rouvres Air Base, France

- 60th Troop Carrier Wing

Reassigned to: Dreux-Louvillier Air Base, France

- 465th Troop Carrier Wing

Reassigned to: Toul-Rosières Air Base, France

- 38th Tactical Bombardment Wing (Light)

Reassigned to: Laon-Couvron Air Base, France

These wings gave USAFE and NATO approximately 500 fighters, 100 light bombers, 100 tactical reconnaissance aircraft, 100 tactical airlift transports, and 18,000 USAF personnel.

==== Rotational Deployments to Mediterranean Bases ====
"Air Strike Force" (1956) USAF promotional film.

With the phase-out of the B-47 Stratojet from SAC in the mid-1960s, the need for Strategic Air Command Operation Reflex European bases diminished and the Sixteenth Air Force (16AF) was turned over to the USAFE on 15 April 1966.

Prior to 1966, TAC routinely deployed CONUS-based North American F-100 Super Sabre wings to 16AF bases in Spain, as well as to Aviano Air Base, Italy. With USAFE taking possession of these bases from SAC, Tactical Air Command reassigned the 401st Tactical Fighter Wing from England Air Force Base, Louisiana to USAFE on a permanent basis to Torrejon Air Base, Spain on 27 April to perform host functions at the base and to support rotational temporary duty (TDY) to Italy and Turkey for NATO alerts. However, when the 401st's fighter squadrons deployed to South Vietnam in the 1960s for the Vietnam War, squadrons from Homestead AFB, Florida and Myrtle Beach AFB, South Carolina were utilized to fill the need in Spain. These squadrons remained in Europe until 1970, when the drawdown in Vietnam allowed the squadrons from the 401st, which were deployed to Southeast Asia, to rejoin their home unit.

=== Composite Air Strike Force ===
see: Nineteenth Air Force

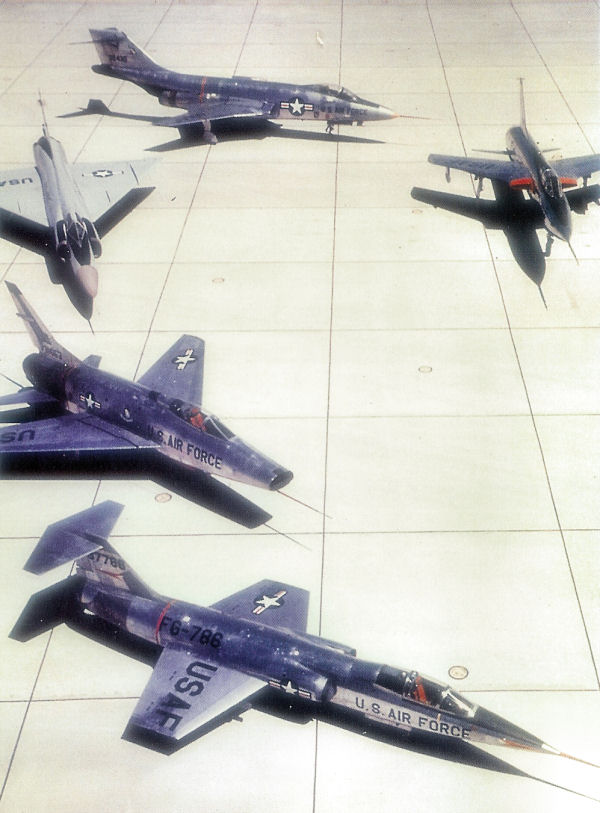
The "Century Series" of tactical fighters. Clockwise from the bottom: F-104 Starfighter, F-100 Super Sabre, F-102 Delta Dagger, F-101 Voodoo, and F-105 Thunderchief. All except the F-102 served in TAC.

In the aftermath of the Korean War, TAC developed the Composite Air Strike Force (CASF) concept, a mobile rapid-deployment strike concept designed to respond to "brush fire" conflicts around the world. A CASF included fighter bomber aircraft for both conventional and nuclear attack missions, as well as troop carrier, tanker, and tactical reconnaissance assets. TAC composite air strike forces were intended to augment existing combat units already in place as part of United States Air Forces in Europe (USAFE), the Pacific Air Forces (PACAF), or the Alaskan Air Command (AAC).

In addition, the new Century Series of TAC fighters were making their first flights, designed from the lessons learned in the air over Korea. As these new fighters and new transport aircraft came on line, there were problems with each one. TAC pilots risked life and limb to iron out the problems and make these aircraft fully operational. Also, with the development of air refueling, TAC could now flex its muscles and demonstrate true global mobility. Deployments to Europe and the Far East became a way of life for TAC units. When Strategic Air Command abandoned its fighter escort force in 1957, those aircraft were transferred to TAC, further augmenting its strength.

The first deployment of the Composite Air Strike Force took place in July 1958 in response to an imminent coup d'état in Lebanon. TAC scrambled forces across the Atlantic to Turkey, where their presence was intended to force an end to the crisis. A similar CASF was deployed in response to conflicts between China and Taiwan in 1958.

CASF received another test in 1961, when the Berlin Crisis resulted in TAC quickly deploying 210 aircraft to Europe, consisting of 144 North American F-100D Super Sabres and 54 Lockheed F-104C Starfighters, but also including 6 McDonnell RF-101 Voodoo and 6 Douglas RB-66C Destroyer reconnaissance aircraft. Also as part of the CASF, the Air National Guard subsequently deployed 36 Lockheed F-104A Starfighters, 54 North American F-86H Sabres, and 90 Republic F-84F Thunderstreaks.

In 1961, Secretary of Defense Robert McNamara organized the United States Strike Command at MacDill AFB, Florida to integrate CASF efforts with those of the Strategic Army Corps. TAC had gone from a meager postwar force to a force capable of putting the right amount of assets in the right place when they were needed.

=== Tactical missiles ===
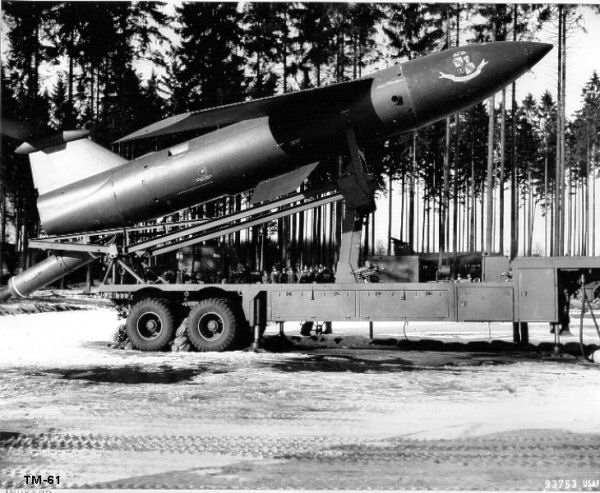
Martin TM-61C "Matador" cruise missile of the 585th Tactical Missile Group, 38th Tactical Missile Wing based at Bitburg Air Base, West Germany, 1958.

In 1949, TAC began testing the Martin B-61, later redesignated as TM-61 Matador surface-to-surface cruise missile at Holloman AFB, New Mexico. The initial flight ended in a crash, but the second launch was successful and outran the chase aircraft. Testing continued with launches of 46 missiles at both Holloman AFB and the Long Range Proving Ground at Cape Canaveral, Florida, and in March 1954 the first operational missile squadron in the U.S. Air Force, the 1st Pilotless Bomber Squadron, was deployed to Bitburg Air Base, Germany. Launches at Holloman and Cape Canaveral continued until 1963, at which time the missile was redesignated again as the MGM-1 Matador.

In 1954, an improved missile, the TM-76A Mace (later redesignated the CGM-13 Mace began development at Holloman AFB, with its first launch in 1956. The ATRAN (Automatic Terrain Recognition and Navigation) Mace "A" was launched from a mobile transporter/launcher while the inertially guided Mace "B" was launched from a hardened bunker. Both used a solid fuel booster rocket for initial acceleration and an Allison J33 turbojet for flight. The TM-76B, redesignated as CGM-13B remained on alert until 30 April 1969 with the 71st Tactical Missile Squadron at Bitburg AB, and until October 1969 with the 498th Tactical Missile Group at Kadena Air Base, Okinawa. As TAC was responsible for training crews that were assigned to both PACAF and USAFE, the only tactical missiles in TAC's inventory were the training missiles of the 4504th Missile Training Wing at Orlando AFB, Florida. Ninth Air Force (TAC), while headquartered at Shaw AFB, South Carolina, maintained the USAF Tactical Missile School at Orlando AFB under command of the 4504 MTW from 1956 until 1966, when the MGM-13A was phased out and the remaining CGM-13Bs were transferred to the Lowry Technical Training Center at Lowry AFB, Colorado.

The U.S. Army had largely assumed the tactical ground launched nuclear missile program until the 1980s when TAC's BGM-109G "Gryphon" ground launched cruise missile (GLCM) was deployed along with the Army's Pershing II ballistic missile to counter the mobile medium- and intermediate- range ballistic nuclear missiles deployed by the Soviet Union in Eastern Bloc countries. This entire class of weaponry was eliminated by the 1987 Intermediate-Range Nuclear Forces Treaty (INF treaty) and removed by 1990, thus reducing both the number and the threat of nuclear warheads.

=== Cuban Missile Crisis ===
The Cold War took on a frightening phase in October 1962. Following the Bay of Pigs fiasco, Soviet Premier Nikita Khrushchev increased Soviet aid to Cuba, including military supplies. In August 1962, the Soviet Union, with Cuban cooperation, began to build intermediate-range ballistic missile (IRBM) and medium-range ballistic missile (MRBM) sites on the island. The American intelligence community, suspicious of the construction on the island, needed tangible proof that Soviet ballistic missiles were being deployed to Cuba and called for photographic aerial reconnaissance.

Routine photo reconnaissance flights over Cuba revealed that the Soviet Union was, in fact, in the process of placing nuclear-armed missiles on that island. In response, the United States let it be known that any use of those missiles against any country in the Western Hemisphere would be considered as an attack on the United States and a full nuclear response on the Soviet Union would be the result. The United States and the Soviet Union stood eyeball to eyeball at the brink of a nuclear exchange.

==== Photographic Reconnaissance ====
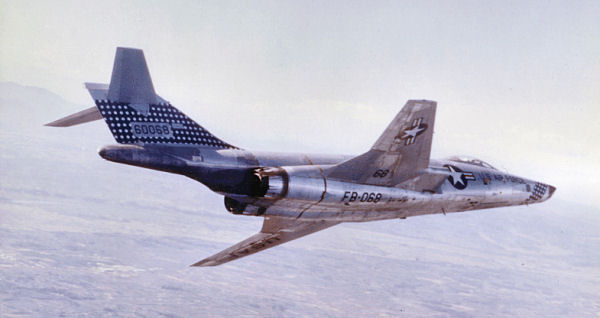
McDonnell RF-101C-65-MC Voodoo AF Serial No. 56-0068 of the 363d Tactical Reconnaissance Wing. This aircraft is currently on static display at the Keesler AFB, Mississippi Air Park.

On 11 October 1962, Headquarters Strategic Air Command (SAC) notified the 4080th Strategic Wing at Laughlin AFB, Texas, to "freeze" two officers, Major Richard S. Heyser and Major Rudolf Anderson, Jr., for a special project. The pair reported to Edwards AFB, California, where they received orders to conduct strategic reconnaissance flights over Cuba. On 13 October, Major Anderson deployed to McCoy AFB, Florida, to join a U-2 aircraft ferried in for the special mission. Meantime, Major Heyser launched from Edwards AFB in a U-2 equipped to photograph suspect sites on the island of Cuba. Heyser arrived over the island during daylight on 14 October and the next day, Major Anderson made his first flight from McCoy AFB. Photographs obtained on these flights confirmed that Soviet/Cuban crews had launch pads under construction that, when completed, could fire nuclear-armed IRBMs with a range of approximately 5,000 miles and MRBMs with a range of approximately 3,000 miles.

While the SAC U-2s flew high-altitude reconnaissance missions, the staff of the 363d Tactical Reconnaissance Wing at Shaw AFB, South Carolina, was made aware of the potential need for low-level flights over Cuba. Mission planners at Shaw began planning such flights and preparing target folders. On 21 October, HQ Tactical Air Command ordered the 363d to deploy to MacDill AFB, Florida. The wing began immediately to move RF-101 Voodoo and RB-66 Destroyer aircraft, personnel, and photographic equipment to Florida. By the next morning, the aircraft were at MacDill, cameras cocked, ready to carry out any reconnaissance missions.

SAC and TAC reconnaissance aircraft were further augmented by reconnaissance aircraft of the U.S. Navy. RF-8A Crusader photo reconnaissance aircraft Light Photographic Squadron SIX TWO (VFP-62) operating from NAS Jacksonville and NAS Key West, Florida conducted high-speed low level reconnaissance flights over the Cuban missile sites while additional P-2 Neptune and P-3 Orion maritime patrol aircraft operating from various bases tracked Soviet ships and submarines transiting to and from Cuba.

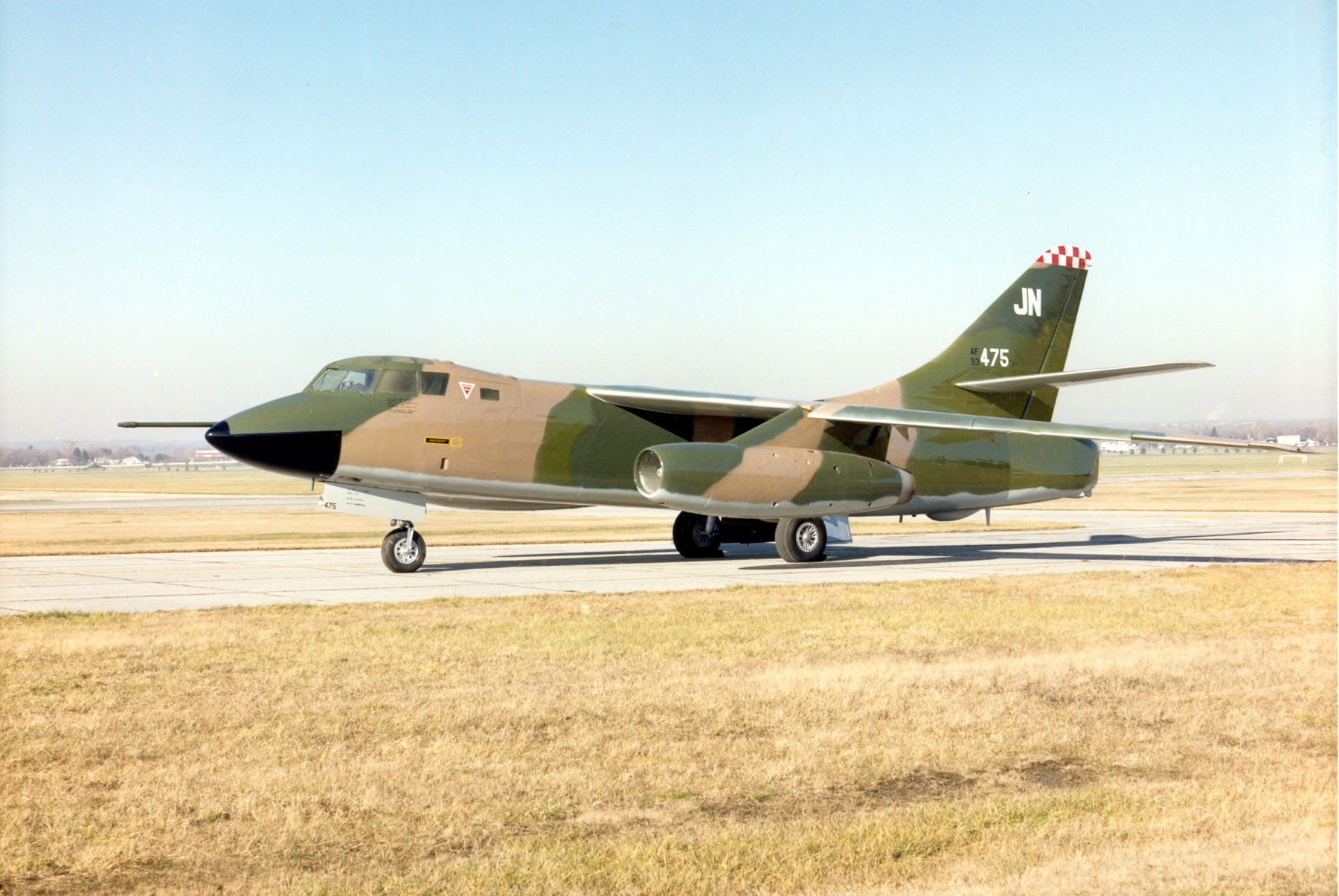
Douglas RB-66B, AF Ser. No. 53-0475 of the 39th Tactical Electronics Warfare Training Squadron, now at the National Museum of the United States Air Force at Wright-Patterson AFB, Ohio

While aircrews went on alert, support personnel expanded the base photo laboratory facilities and installed additional photo vans and darkrooms. Because of a shortage of adequate facilities, aircrews and other airmen occupied temporary, inadequate, wooden barracks that hampered crew rest. After trying off-base housing, the aircrews moved to permanent airmen's quarters on the base for the remainder of the deployment. On 26 October, the 363rd launched the first flight of two low-level reconnaissance RF-101 aircraft. For the next three weeks, wing aircraft, by photographic and visual reconnaissance, gathered vital data, including prestrike intelligence, air-surveillance verification of Cuban buildup, and subsequent dismantling of the IRBM and MRBM sites and Soviet Ilyushin Il-28 jet tactical bombers. Because of the possibility of alternate sites and concealed storage facilities, the wing initiated intensive low-level aerial search efforts. Other flights returned with highly significant photographs of missiles and related equipment on docks at Cuban ports, the loading of Soviet freighters, and the deck cargo of Soviet ships entering and leaving Cuban ports. Consequently, the President of the United States was constantly aware of Soviet actions regarding the withdrawal of the missiles from Cuba.

Analysis of the 363d photographs provided a wide range of essential intelligence concerning Cuba. Frequent sorties over major Cuban airfields provided daily information on the number, type, and specific location of Cuban aircraft. Photos also revealed the number and location of assembled, partially assembled, or unassembled IL-28 Soviet twin-engine tactical bombers with a range of 1,500 miles. This information was vital to establish immediate air superiority if strike forces went into action. On one of these missions, the 363d discovered the first evidence of the existence of infrared homing air-to-air missiles (Soviet AA-2s). Surface-to-air missile (SAM) sites proved to be prime targets for low-level reconnaissance missions. The wing also garnered extensive intelligence concerning Cuban ground equipment, military encampments, cruise-missile sites, and possible landing beaches for amphibious assault by U.S. Army and U.S. Marine Corps forces.

==== Tactical Air Command combat aircraft deployment to Florida bases ====
SAC ordered continual U-2 reconnaissance flights over Cuba and, at the same time, ordered the redeployment of its medium and heavy bombers and tanker aircraft from its three Florida bases, MacDill AFB, McCoy AFB and Homestead AFB, in order to make room for TAC fighter aircraft. In mid-October, the Nineteenth Air Force (19AF) moved from its home base of Seymour Johnson AFB, North Carolina, to Homestead AFB, Florida. Once at Homestead AFB, 19AF spearheaded the deployment of TAC units at the beginning of the Cuban Missile Crisis, deploying numerous F-84, F-100, F-105, RB-66, and KB-50 units and aircraft to the SAC bases in Florida.

19AF's commander headed the main air operations center, the Air Force Atlantic Advanced Operational Nucleus (ADVON). Augmented by airmen and officers from other TAC air forces, Air Force Atlantic ADVON soon controlled nearly 1,000 aircraft and 7,000 men and women. During the Cuban Missile Crisis four primary Air Elements were organized and postured in Florida. Air Force record cards and historical records contain the following information:

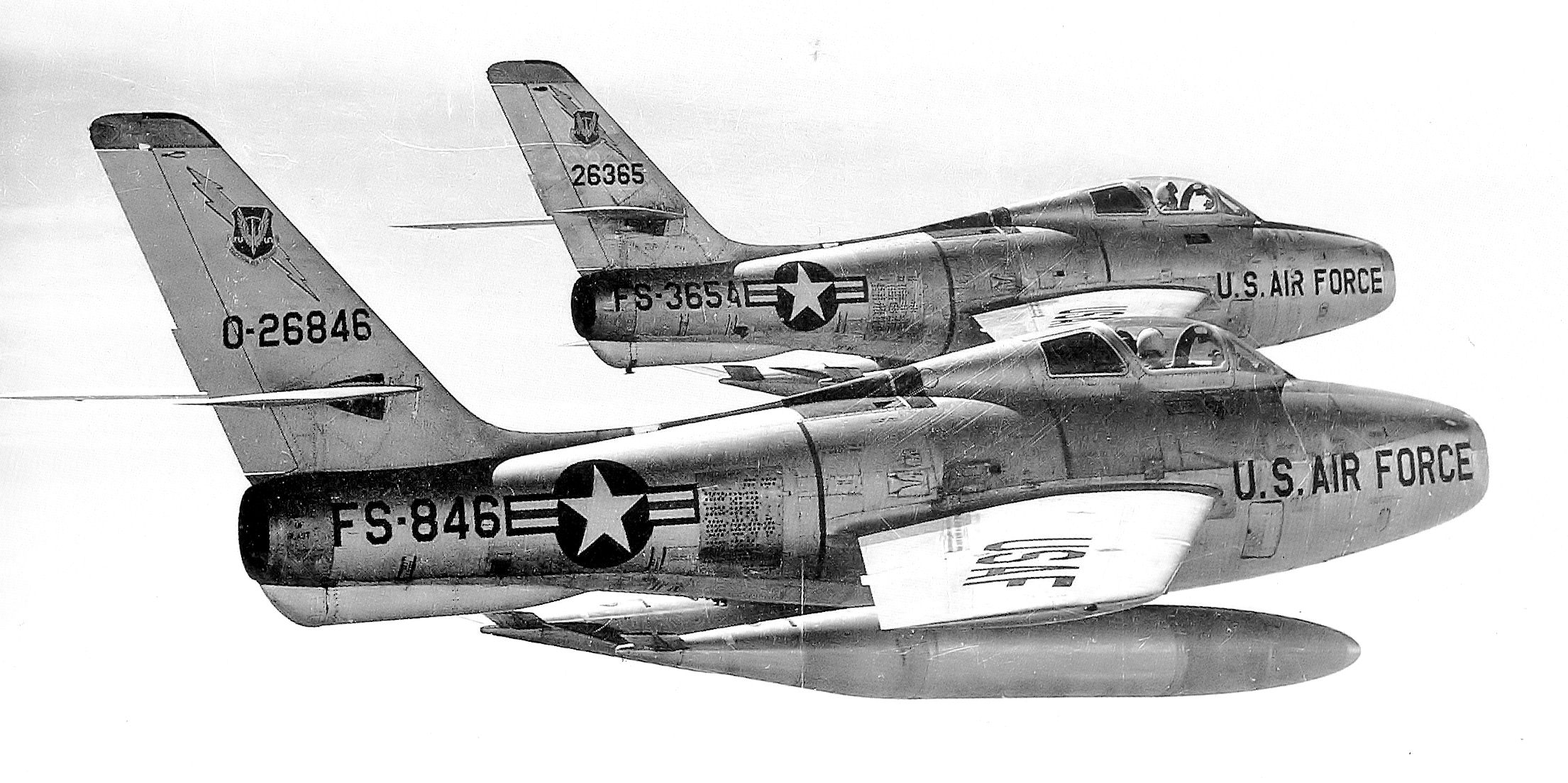
12th Tactical Fighter Wing F-84F Thunderstreaks

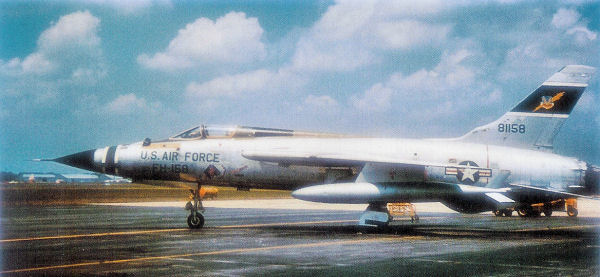
Republic F-105D-5-RE Thunderchief, AF Ser. No. 58-1158, deployed to McCoy AFB, FL by the 4 TFW during the Cuban Missile Crisis.

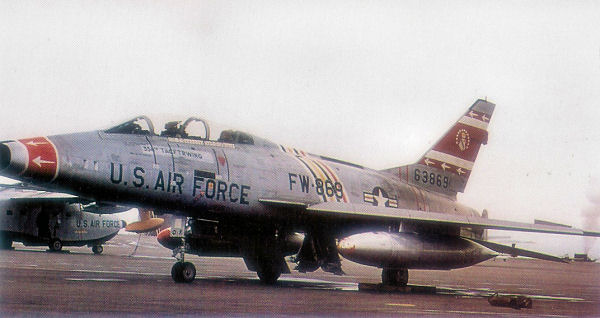
North American F-100F-10-NA Super Sabre, AF Ser. No. 56-3869, of the 354th Tactical Fighter Wing, deployed to McCoy AFB, FL. The aircraft is marked as the Wing Commander's aircraft.

- HQ, Air Force Provisional 33 (Fighter Recon). Organized at Homestead AFB and assigned to TAC, with attachment to Air Force Atlantic (Main). The Air Division Provisional 1, 2, and 3 were assigned as elements at the same time.
- HQ, Air Division Provisional 1 was organized at Homestead AFB and assigned to the Air Force Provisional 33 (Fighter Reconnaissance). On 29 Oct 1962, the division was relieved from assignment to Air Force Provisional 33 and assigned directly to TAC. At the same time, it was attached to the Air Force Atlantic (ADVON). Serving in the division were deployed elements of the following wings:

31st Tactical Fighter Wing (F-100), Homestead AFB Florida, 24 Oct-9 Nov 1962
401st Tactical Fighter Wing (F-100), England AFB, Louisiana, 24 Oct-9 Nov 1962
474th Tactical Fighter Wing (F-100), Cannon AFB, New Mexico, 24 Oct-9 Nov 1962

Altogether, the 1st Provisional Air Division included a force of 181 F-100 fighter aircraft and over 1,600 personnel.

- HQ, Air Division Provisional 2 was also organized at McCoy AFB, Florida, and assigned to AF Prov 33 (Ftr Recon). On 29 Oct 1962, the division was relieved from assignment to 33 AF Prov 33 (Ftr Recon) and assigned directly to TAC, with attachment to AF Atlantic (ADVON).

4th Tactical Fighter Wing (F-105), Seymour Johnson AFB, North Carolina, 21 Oct-c. 29 Nov 1962
354th Tactical Fighter Wing (F-100), Myrtle Beach AFB, South Carolina, 21 Oct–1 Dec 1962
427th Air Refueling Squadron: (20 KB-50J Superfortress), Langley AFB, Virginia

- HQ, Air Division Provisional 3 was organized at MacDill AFB, Florida, and assigned to AF Prov 33 (Ftr Recon). On 29 Oct 1962, the division was relieved from assignment to 33 AF Prov 33 (Ftr Recon) and assigned directly to TAC, with attachment to AF Atlantic (ADVON).

12th Tactical Fighter Wing (F-84F), MacDill AFB, Florida
15th Tactical Fighter Wing (F-84F), MacDill AFB, Florida
27th Tactical Fighter Wing (F-100), Cannon AFB, New Mexico, 21 Oct-1 Dec 1962
363d Tactical Reconnaissance Wing (RF-101), (RB-66), Shaw AFB, South Carolina, 21 Oct-30 Nov 1962

Civilian airports in West Palm Beach, Fort Lauderdale and Miami, Florida also received TAC Units.

Like the Navy's RF-8A Crusaders, TAC RF-101 Voodoo reconnaissance aircraft from Shaw AFB continued to fly high speed low level sorties over Cuba on a daily basis, photographing suspected missile sites and Cuban military bases. In some cases the films were flown directly to Washington, D.C., and onto President John F. Kennedy's desk within hours of being taken.

General Walter C. Sweeney, Jr., Commander of Tactical Air Command, proposed an operational plan which called first for an air attack on the surface-to-air missile (SAM) sites in the vicinity of known medium range (MRBM) and intermediate range ballistic missile (IRBM) launchers by eight fighter-bombers per SAM site. Concurrently, each of the Cuban MiG airfields thought to be protecting MRBM/IRBM sites were to be struck by at least twelve fighters. Following the air-strikes on SAM sites and MiG fighter airfields, each MRBM and IRBM launch site was to be attacked by at least twelve aircraft. General Sweeney's plan was accepted and, additionally, Cuban Ilyushin Il-28 "Beagle" bombers bases were added to the target list.

==== Crisis resolution ====
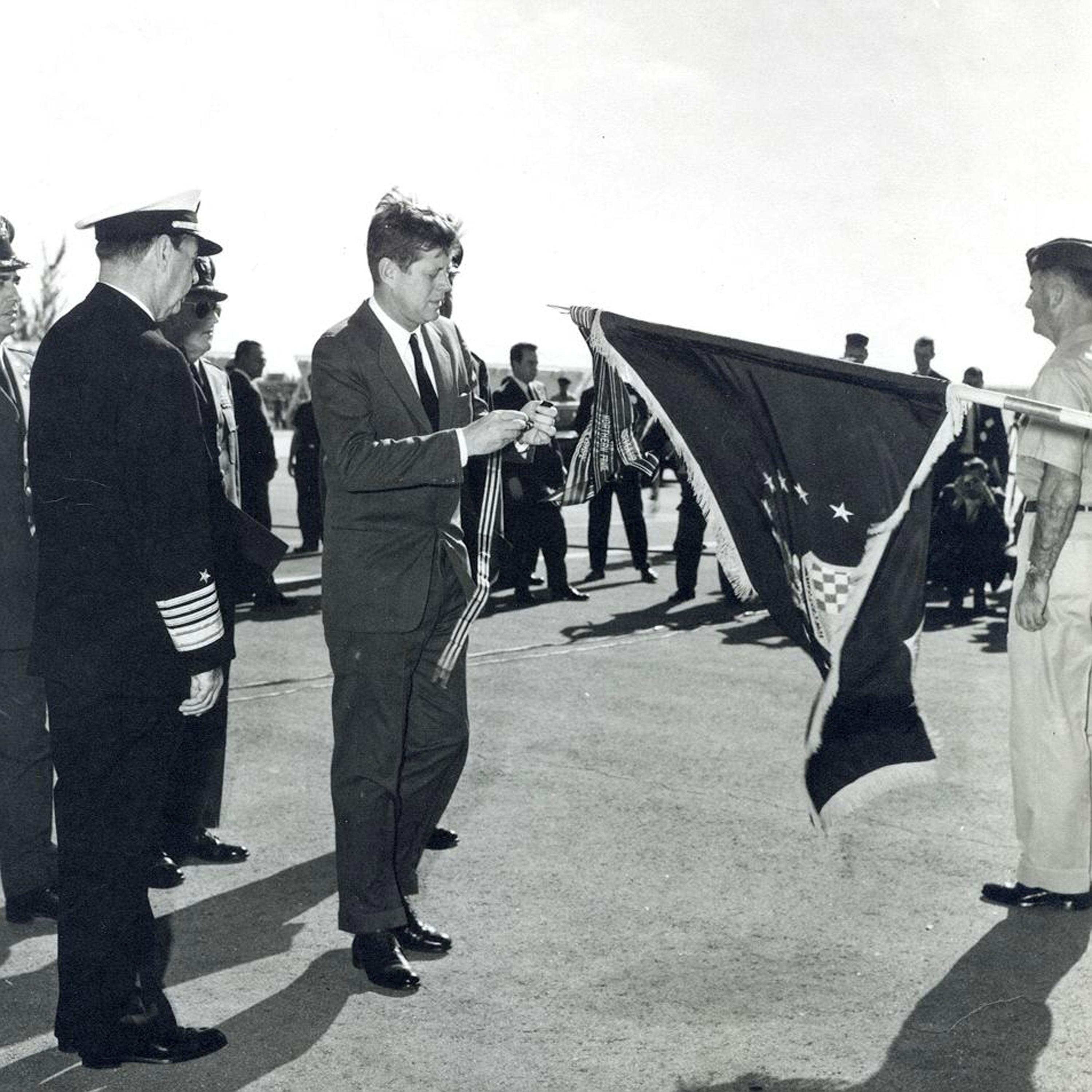
President Kennedy presents AFOUA to the 363 TRW in 1962 in recognition of the unit's actions associated with the Cuban Missile Crisis.

While the invasion forces gathered in Florida, Kennedy ordered the U.S. State Department to develop a plan for civil governance in Cuba. Former Secretary of State Dean Acheson and the Joint Chiefs of Staff favored an invasion, but U.S. Attorney General Robert F. Kennedy vehemently opposed that plan and instead advocated a blockade. The President listened to his brother, and on 22 October 1962, appeared on television to explain to America and the world that the United States was imposing a strict quarantine on offensive military equipment being shipped to Cuba. Kennedy also warned Khrushchev that the United States would regard any missile attack from Cuba as an attack from the Soviet Union and would retaliate against the Soviet Union.

The quarantine began on 24 October and tensions mounted as the Soviets continued to work on the missile sites and their ships continued moving toward Cuba. Then on 26 October, Khrushchev sent another message in which he offered to withdraw or destroy the weapons in Cuba, provided the United States would lift the blockade and promise not to invade the island. The increasing tempo in the military, however, continued unabated. SAC ordered over sixty B-52 bombers to continue on airborne alert, while TAC forces in Florida assumed a one-hour alert and prepared to go to a fifteen-minute alert, which involved pilots waiting in aircraft for launch orders.

After a heated debate Robert Kennedy met with the Soviet Ambassador to the United States, Anatoly Dobrynin, and in effect, promised to remove obsolete American PGM-19 Jupiter MRBMs from Turkey. This promise was sufficient and the next day the Soviet Union informed the United States that the missiles in Cuba would be withdrawn. The Soviets began turning their ships around, packing up the missiles in Cuba, and dismantling the launch pads. As the work progressed, the Air Force started to redeploy aircraft back to home bases and lower the alert status. The United States and Soviet Union stepped back from the brink, and the crisis was resolved without armed conflict. Never in the history of the Cold War had the United States and the Soviet Union come so very close to mutual nuclear destruction.

=== New Aircraft ===
In 1962, the Air Force commenced evaluation of the US Navy/US Marine Corps F-4 Phantom II as a possible replacement for older fighter aircraft in the counter-air, interdiction and close air support (CAS) roles. In January 1962, two Navy F4H-1 aircraft were loaned to USAF and, since the 18 September 1962 naming convention for all DoD aircraft had not yet taken effect, were given the interim designation of F-110A Spectre. Twenty-four additional USN F4H-1 aircraft, subsequently redesignated as F-4Bs, were loaned to USAF for additional evaluation. This evaluation resulted in a USAF decision to acquire their own version of the F-4, designated as the F-4C. Following its initial flight in May 1963, the F-4C entered USAF service with TAC in November 1963. The F-4 would prove to be one of the most numerous jet fighters ever operated by USAF, with over 2800 examples acquired for service in TAC, USAFE, PACAF and the Air Force Systems Command (AFSC), to include later versions such as the RF-4C, F-4D, F-4E and F-4G.

In 1960, DoD also combined a USAF requirement for a new fighter-bomber to ostensibly replace TAC's F-105 fighter-bombers with a USN need for a new carrier-based air superiority fighter, then launched a competition among aircraft manufacturers for the final design. In 1962, General Dynamics and Boeing were selected as finalists with the General Dynamics variable-geometry wing Tactical Fighter Experimental (TFX) design eventually winning out. Designated as the F-111, the Navy version was known as the F-111B and the USAF version the F-111A, with the first flight of the F-111A taking place in December 1964 and the first production models delivered to the USAF in 1967. Additional variants such as the FB-111A for SAC and the F-111E, F-111F and EF-111A for TAC and USAFE, plus the F-111K for the RAAF followed. Meanwhile, the Navy's F-111B program was canceled after five examples when it became apparent that its performance characteristics were unsuitable for an aircraft-carrier based fighter and interceptor, with many of its design features and systems being incorporated into the successful Grumman F-14 Tomcat. In all, 562 F-111s of all series were built.

USAF also acquired a number of other USN aircraft originally designed for aircraft carrier use and pressed them into USAF service. This included the transfer of the piston-engine Douglas A-1 Skyraider in its A-1E and A-1H variants being retired from the Navy inventory in the mid-1960s for close air support, rescue aircraft escort, and special operations duties in Vietnam, as well as the Navy's LTV A-7 Corsair II light attack bomber in new production numbers, the USAF versions of which were designated A-7D and A-7K.

In the case of the A-7, the USAF was initially reluctant to take on yet another Navy-designed aircraft, but on 5 November 1965, Secretary of the Air Force Harold Brown and Chief of Staff of the Air Force, General John P. McConnell, announced that USAF had decided to order a version of the aircraft, designated A-7D, for TAC. The first A-7D made its initial flight in April 1968, and deliveries of production models began in December 1968. When A-7D production ended in 1976, LTV had delivered 459 to the U.S. Air Force. These aircraft continued in TAC service until supplanted by F-16 Fighting Falcon or A-10 Thunderbolt II aircraft. Most A-7Ds and all A-7Ks were later transferred to Air National Guard (ANG) units operationally-gained by TAC, remaining in ANG service until 1993 when they, too, were replaced by the F-16 or A-10.

=== Pacific Air Forces and the Vietnam War ===
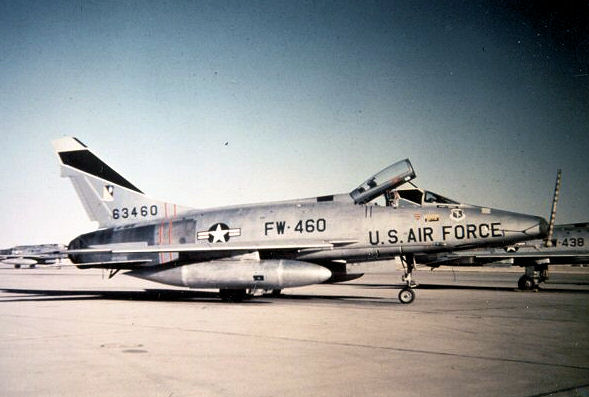
North American F-100D-85-NH Super Sabre Serial 56-3460 of the 27th TFW, deployed on TDY to Takhli Royal Thai Air Force Base in 1964 from Cannon AFB, New Mexico.

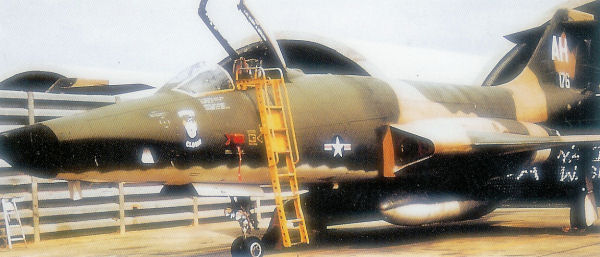
RF-101C, AF Ser No. 56–0176 of the 460th Tactical Recon Squadron – Tan Son Nhut Air Base – 1969

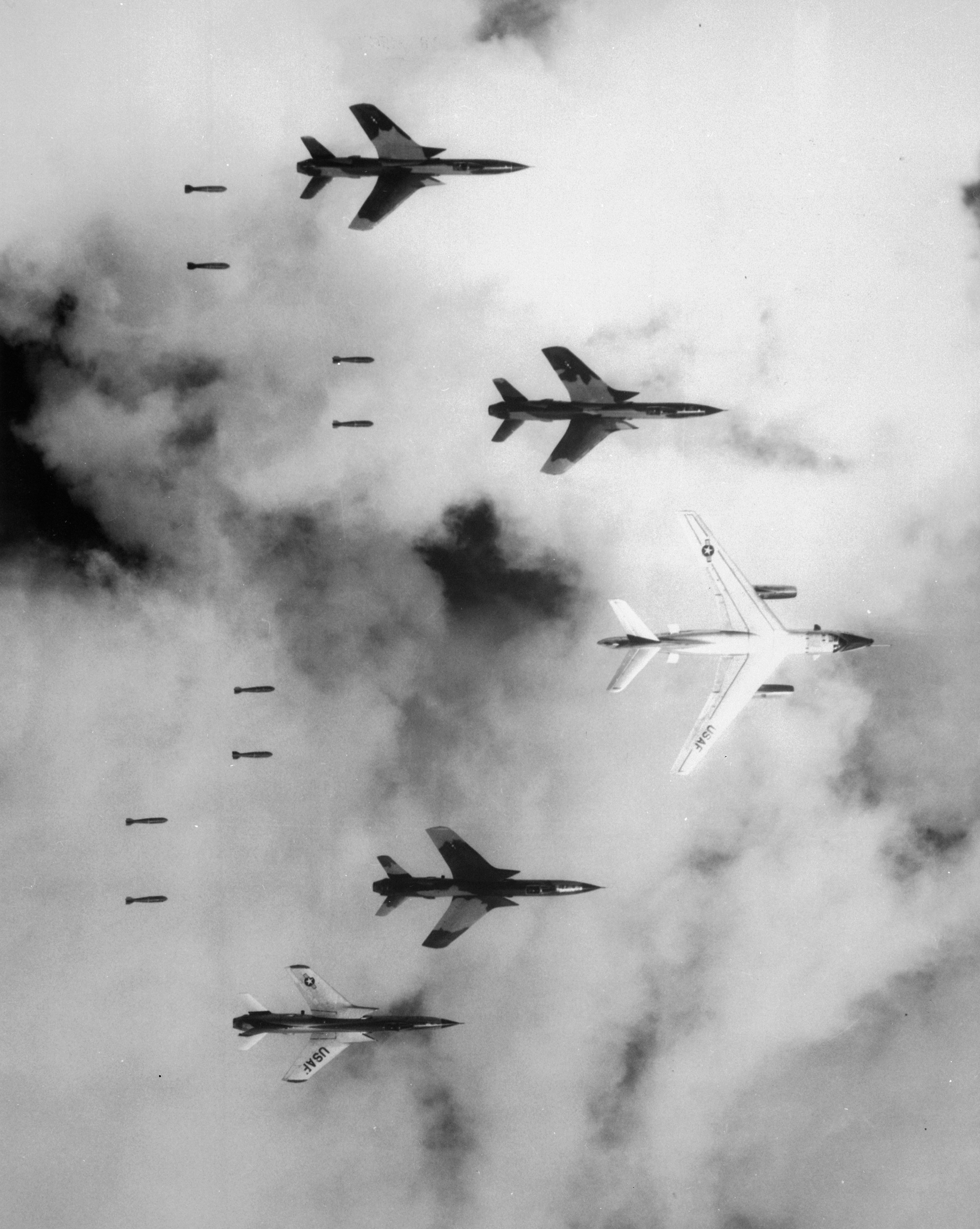
F-105s with an EB-66 from the 355th TFW based at Takhli Royal Thai Air Force Base.

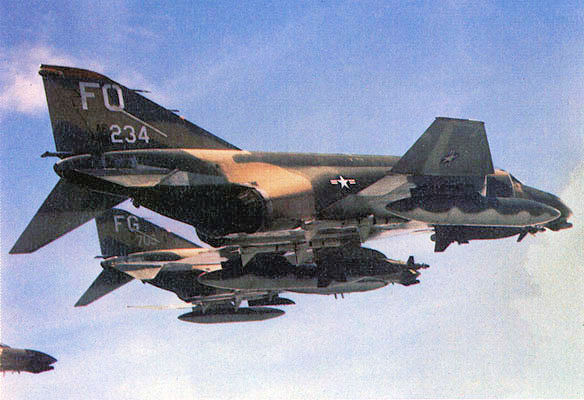
McDonnell F-4D-29-MC Phantom, AF Ser. No. 66-0234, of the 8th Tactical Fighter Wing at Ubon Royal Thai Air Force Base with laser-guided bombs on a mission north. The 8th TFW deployed to Thailand from George AFB, California in 1965.

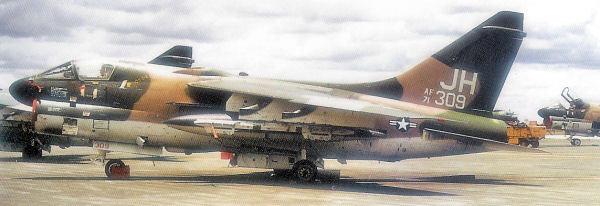
A-7D-10-CV, AF Ser. No. 71-0309 from the 388th TFW, Korat RTAFB Thailand, 1973. After the end of Vietnam War, the 388th TFW returned to Hill AFB, Utah.

During the tenure of the Kennedy Administration, as an additional background to the Cold War there was the onset of low intensity guerrilla wars and wars of insurgency with proxies of the Soviet Union. During 1963, the situation in South Vietnam was heating up on a daily basis and more and more "military advisors" were being sent to that small country in Southeast Asia.

==== Special Operations Units ====
Air Force Special Forces units became part of TAC in 1961 when a counter-insurgency force was activated at Eglin AFB, Florida. Aircraft of these units consisted of a combination of propeller-driven World War II and Korean War-vintage fighters, modified trainers, Douglas B-26 Invader attack bombers and an eclectic collection of cargo and utility aircraft. Originally activated as a Combat Crew Training Squadron, the unit was upgraded to a wing and designated as the 1st Air Commando Wing. In 1964, TAC ordered a squadron of specially modified C-130E aircraft to support U.S. Army Special Forces and Central Intelligence Agency teams operating deep inside enemy territory. As the war in Vietnam intensified, additional air commando units were organized in Southeast Asia. In 1968, these units were redesignated as "Special Operations" squadrons.

==== Tactical Fighters ====
In response to what has become known as the Gulf of Tonkin incident in 1964, TAC pilots and support personnel found themselves deployed to places like Da Nang AB and Phan Rang AB in South Vietnam and Takhli RTAFB and Korat RTAFB in Thailand. Initially, TAC began deploying squadrons of F-100 Super Sabre, RF-101 Voodoo and F-105 Thunderchief aircraft to these overseas installations under the cognizance of PACAF. As the American effort in Southeast Asia increased, TAC used a process of deploying squadrons to PACAF-operated bases in South Vietnam and Thailand, with the squadrons being attached temporarily on rotational deployments or being permanently reassigned to the PACAF wing.

For the next decade, TAC would be consumed by operations in Vietnam, Cambodia and Laos. On a daily basis, flight crews trained by TAC would hurl themselves and their planes at targets across the area of operations, to include over the skies of North Vietnam. As the command responsible for training aircrews for overseas duty, TAC maintained Readiness Training Units in the United States to train pilots and other aircrew members for fighters, reconnaissance and troop carrier (redesignated tactical airlift after 1 July 1966) squadrons in the Pacific.

==== Troop Carrier ====
In December 1964, TAC deployed a squadron of C-123 Provider assault transports from the 464th Troop Carrier Wing at Pope AFB, North Carolina to Clark Air Base, Philippines, then on to Tan Son Nhut Air Base, South Vietnam to set up a tactical air cargo transportation system.

To support the increased military strength in Southeast Asia, TAC also began deploying its C-130 equipped troop carrier (later re-designated tactical airlift) squadrons to bases in Okinawa and the Philippines. In late 1965, TAC transferred two C-130 wings and two additional squadrons, a total of eight squadrons, to PACAF's 315th Air Division for operations in Southeast Asia.

==== 1972 Spring Invasion ====
In 1970, the war was beginning to wind down as the conflict was being Vietnamized. Units from the Republic of Vietnam Air Force (VNAF) took on more and more combat to defend their nation and USAF tactical air strength was reduced as several air bases and, in some cases, formerly USAF aircraft, were turned over to the VNAF.

Bombing of North Vietnam (Operation Rolling Thunder) had ended in 1968, and as a result, North Vietnamese forces had built up their air defenses and continued to pour men and equipment into the South via the Ho Chi Minh trail. By the beginning of 1972 there were only about 235 USAF tactical combat aircraft in Southeast Asia. Vietnamization was severely tested by the Easter Offensive of 1972, a massive conventional invasion of South Vietnam by North Vietnamese Army forces in spring 1972. On 30 March 1972, the People's Army of Vietnam (PAVN) launched an all out invasion of South Vietnam with over 13 divisions, pushing South Vietnamese units aside with little difficulty. President Nixon stepped up air strikes to turn back the invasion, or at least to slow it down.

In response to the invasion, TAC deployed both squadrons and wings to air bases in Thailand. Known units deployed were:

- Udorn Royal Thai Air Force Base

8th Tactical Fighter Squadron, Eglin AFB, Florida (F-4E)
414th Fighter Weapons Squadron, Nellis AFB, Nevada (F-4E)

- Ubon Royal Thai Air Force Base

4th Tactical Fighter Wing, Seymour Johnson AFB, North Carolina (F-4D)

- Takhli Royal Thai Air Force Base

49th Tactical Fighter Wing, Holloman AFB, New Mexico (F-4D)

By October 1972, the effect of the air campaign was being felt in North Vietnam. North Vietnamese delegates returned to the bargaining table in Paris to engage in peace talks in a serious manner. Besides the pressure from USAF, USN and USMC tactical fighters, fighter-bombers and fighter aircraft, as well as USAF B-52 bombers, the political climate in Moscow and Peking had changed to encourage the North Vietnamese to agree to a settlement.

==== Uneasy Peace 1973 ====
On 27 January 1973, the Paris Peace Accords were signed with an effective date of 28 January 1973. For TAC, the war in Southeast Asia (SEA) was almost over. With the official end of hostilities came the long-awaited release of American Prisoners of War from inside North Vietnam. The last USAF aircraft left South Vietnam at the end of January 1973, and the final group of American Prisoners of War were released from North Vietnam on 29 March 1973.

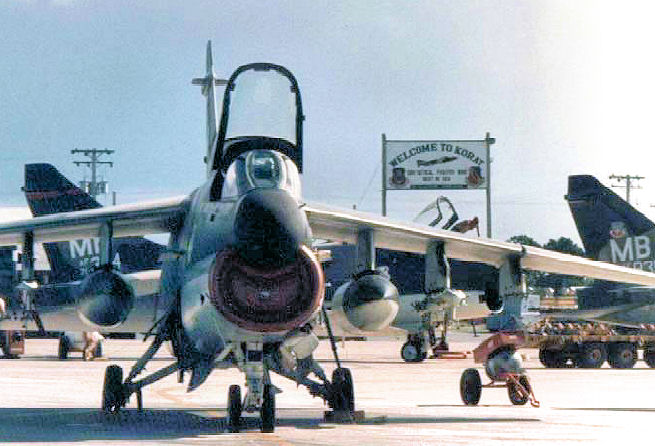
TAC A-7Ds of the deployed 354th Tactical Fighter Wing deployed at Korat Royal Thai Air Force Base, 1972. An A-7D from the 354th fired the last shot in anger of the Vietnam War on 15 August 1973. A-7Ds from Korat RTAFB maintained an alert status in Thailand and participated in the 1975 SS Mayaguez Rescue.

The accords effectively ended United States military operations in North and South Vietnam. Laos and Cambodia, however, were not signatories to the Paris agreement and remained in states of war with their internal rebel forces.

The United States was helping the Royal Laotian government achieve whatever advantage possible before working out a settlement with the Laotian communists and their allies. The USAF flew combat sorties over Laos during January and February 1973. On 17 April, the USAF flew its last mission over Laos, working a handful of targets requested by the Laotian government.

In Cambodia, there was no peace in 1973. Local communist insurgents of the Khmer Rouge kept up their attacks on the Cambodian capital, Phnom Penh, so the Cambodian Government urgently called upon the U.S. for help and the USAF in Thailand was ordered to carry out a massive bombing campaign against the insurgents on the outskirts of the city. The Cambodian Army would attempt to attack Khmer Rouge forces, however the rebels would simply slip away and move somewhere else. This tactic effectively succeeded in wearing down the government forces. In July and August 1973, the Khmer Rouge focused on taking Phanom Penh and other major cities. In addition, it was reported that the Khmer Rouge was utilizing tear gas in its attacks.

Congressional pressure in Washington grew against these bombings, and on 30 June 1973, the United States Congress passed public law PL 93-50 and 93-52, which cut off all funds for combat in Cambodia and all of Indochina effective 15 August 1973. Air strikes by the USAF peaked just before the deadline, as the Cambodian Army engaged a force of about 10,000 Khmer Rouge rebels that encircled Phnom Penh.

The last shot fired in anger in Southeast Asia was by a TAC A-7D Corsair II of the TAC deployed 354th Tactical Fighter Wing, based at Korat Royal Thai Air Force Base over the suburbs of Phnom Penh. By the end of 1975, all TAC units and aircraft were withdrawn from Southeast Asia.

==== Known TAC units and aircraft deployed to Southeast Asia (1964–1975) ====
- 3rd Tactical Fighter Wing (F-100) England AFB, LA
- 4th Tactical Fighter Wing (F-105, F-4) Seymour Johnson AFB, NC
- 8th Tactical Fighter Wing (F-4) George AFB, CA
- 12th Tactical Fighter Wing (F-4) MacDill Air Force Base, FL
- 23d Tactical Fighter Wing (F-105, A-7D) McConnell AFB, KS; England AFB, LA
- 27th Tactical Fighter Wing (F-100) Cannon AFB, NM
- 31st Tactical Fighter Wing (F-100, F-4) Homestead AFB, FL
- 33d Tactical Fighter Wing (F-4) Eglin AFB, FL
- 35th Tactical Fighter Wing (F-4) George AFB, CA
- 49th Tactical Fighter Wing (F-4) Holloman AFB,
- 140th Tactical Fighter Wing (F-100) Buckley ANGB, CO
- 314th Troop Carrier Wing (C-130E) Sewart AFB, TN
- 347th Tactical Fighter Wing (F-111) Cannon AFB, NM
- 354th Tactical Fighter Wing (F-100, A-7D), Myrtle Beach AFB, SC
- 355th Tactical Fighter Wing (F-105, A-7D) McConnell AFB KS; Davis-Monthan AFB, AZ
- 366th Tactical Fighter Wing (F-100, F-4) Cannon AFB, NM
- 388th Tactical Fighter Wing (F-100, F-4) McConnell AFB, KS
- 401st Tactical Fighter Wing (F-4C) England AFB, LA
- 463rd Troop Carrier Wing (C-130B) Langley AFB, VA
- 474th Tactical Fighter Wing (F-100, F-111) Cannon AFB, NM, Nellis AFB, NV
- 479th Tactical Fighter Wing (F-4) George AFB, CA
- 193d Tactical Electronic Warfare Group (EC-121) Olmsted AFB, PA (Air National Guard)
- 363d Tactical Reconnaissance Wing (RB/EB-66) Shaw AFB, SC
- 432nd Tactical Reconnaissance Wing (RF-101, RF-4C) Shaw AFB, SC
- 507th Tactical Control Group (O-2) Shaw AFB, SC
- 552nd Airborne Early Warning & Control Wing (EC-121D) McClellan AFB, CA
- 553rd Reconnaissance Wing (EC-121R) Korat Royal Thai Air Force Base, Thailand
- 29th Troop Carrier Squadron (C-130B) Forbes AFB, KS
- 41st Troop Carrier Squadron (C-130A) Lockbourne AFB, OH
- 50th Troop Carrier Squadron (C-130E) Sewart AFB, TN
- 345th Troop Carrier Squadron (C-130E) Dyess AFB, TX
- 776th Troop Carrier Squadron (C-130E) Pope AFB, NC

=== Post-Vietnam era ===
Hard lessons had been learned during the Vietnam War. New methods of projecting global air power had been perfected and several new types of aircraft were developed as a result of some of the lessons and shortcomings that had been learned in the skies over Hanoi.

The first of these was the F-15 Eagle, an optimized air superiority fighter to replace the F-4 Phantom II in counter-air and the F-106 Delta Dart in air defense roles and would not engage in multi-mission air-to-ground roles. Following operational test and evaluation, the first F-15A was delivered to TAC's 1st Tactical Fighter Wing at Langley AFB, Virginia in November 1974. Training on the new type, which also included twin seat F-15B versions, began at once.

The A-10 Thunderbolt II, optimized as a close air support aircraft with emphasis on being able to defeat Soviet armor in the event of a Soviet/Warsaw Pact invasion of Western Europe, began arriving in March 1977 at Myrtle Beach AFB, South Carolina, equipping the 354th Tactical Fighter Wing.

Finally, the F-16 Fighting Falcon, later nicknamed the "Viper," also entered the Air Force inventory, initially assigned to the 388th Tactical Fighter Wing at Hill AFB, Utah in January 1979. With the cost of acquiring the F-15 continuing to escalate in the early and mid-1970s, the F-16 was the successful design of the USAF Lightweight Fighter (LWF) competition, increasing overall USAF tactical fighter numbers with a multi-mission fighter that could replace those F-4 Phantom IIs not replaced by the F-15 in the air-to-air role and being able to concurrently assumed the F-4's role in air-to-ground / interdiction roles.

==== Divestment of Tactical Airlift ====
It was found during the Vietnam War that there was a large duplication of aerial port facilities and mission objectives between MAC, TAC and PACAF. A study group recommended the consolidation of all tactical airlift forces under MAC as a cost-saving measure under MAC and on 1 December 1974 all TAC and TAC-gained AFRES and ANG C-130 tactical airlift wings, groups and squadrons were reassigned to MAC. In 1975, PACAF and USAFE tactical airlift wings were also reassigned to MAC, thus ending the theater troop carrier mission as it had existed since the beginning of World War II.

==== Inactivation of Aerospace Defense Command and assumption of the Continental Air Defense mission ====
In early 1977, strong congressional pressure to reduce USAF management "overhead", and the personal conviction of the Air Force Chief of Staff that substantial savings could be realized without a reduction in operational capability, resulted in the disestablishment of Aerospace Defense Command (ADC) as a USAF major command.

ADC was inactivated on 1 October 1979, with its "atmospheric" resources e.g., its Regular Air Force and Air National Guard F-101, F-102 and F-106 fighter-interceptors; ground-based warning radars; and associated bases and personnel) subsequently transferred to TAC under a sub-entity named Air Defense, Tactical Air Command (ADTAC). ADC's EC-121 Warning Star airborne early warning aircraft had already been retired by 1978 and it never received that aircraft's replacement, the E-3 Sentry AWACS, that began entering the TAC inventory in 1977. As a result of changes in USAF doctrine and tactics, AWACS was always intended as strictly a TAC airframe nominally operating from forward-deployed locations and incorporating many of the lessons learned from employing the EC-121 in its Big Eye, College Eye, Rivet Top and Disco roles with PACAF's 7th Air Force during the Vietnam War.

The new command was, essentially, a transition organization between ADC, and the transfer of the continental air defense mission from a combination of the Regular Air Force and the Air National Guard to one totally residing in TAC-gained assets of the Air National Guard by 1990.

==== Red Flag Aggressor training ====
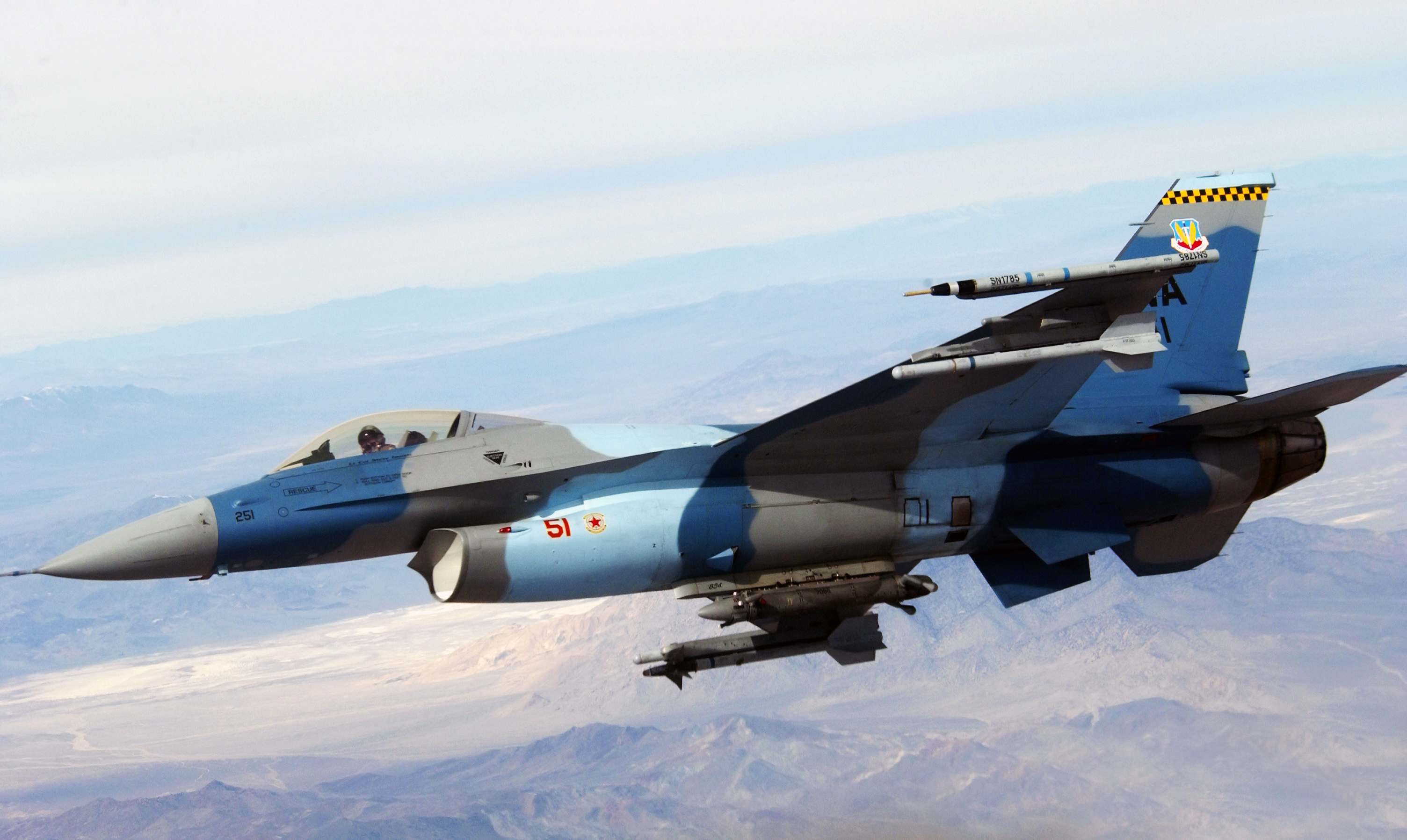
F-16C aggressor aircraft during Red Flag 06-1

The 57th Fighter Weapons Wing at Nellis AFB, Nevada began giving Regular Air Force units some of the most intense combat training ever achieved through the Red Flag program, beginning in 1976. This would later expand to include the Air Force Reserve, the Air National Guard, aviation squadrons of the U.S. Navy and U.S. Marine Corps (augmenting their Naval Fighter Weapons School / TOPGUN program), and various NATO and Allied nations.

The origin of Red Flag was the unacceptable performance of U.S. Air Force pilots and weapon systems officers in air combat maneuvering (ACM) (air-to-air combat) during the Vietnam War in comparison to previous wars. Air combat over North Vietnam between 1965 and 1973 led to an overall exchange ratio (ratio of enemy aircraft shot down to the number of own aircraft lost to enemy fighters) of 2.2:1. In fact, for a period of time in June and July 1972 during Operation Linebacker, the ratio was less than 1:1.

The aggressor units at Red Flag were originally equipped with readily available T-38 Talon aircraft loaned from the Air Training Command (ATC) to simulate the Soviet Union's MiG-21. Northrop F-5 Tiger II fighters, painted in color schemes commonly found on Soviet and Warsaw Pact aircraft, were added shortly thereafter and became the mainstay until the F-16 was introduced in the mid/late 1980s.

The Red Flag exercises, conducted in four to six cycles per year by the 414th Combat Training Squadron evolved into large scale aerial war games, with the purpose being to train pilots, navigators, weapon systems officers, electronic warfare officers and air battle managers from the U.S., NATO and other allied countries for combat situations. This includes the use of "enemy" hardware and live ammunition for bombing exercises within the Nevada Test and Training Range (NTTR).

==== Operation Eagle Claw and divestment of USAF Special Operations forces ====
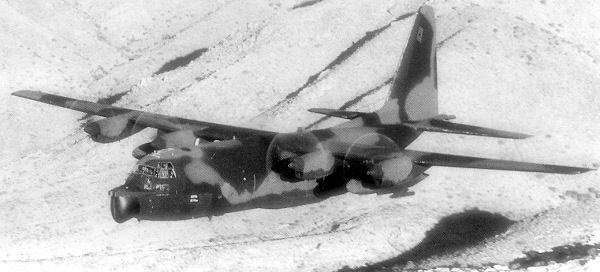
MC-130E "Combat Talon" Special Operations aircraft from Hurlburt Field, Florida.

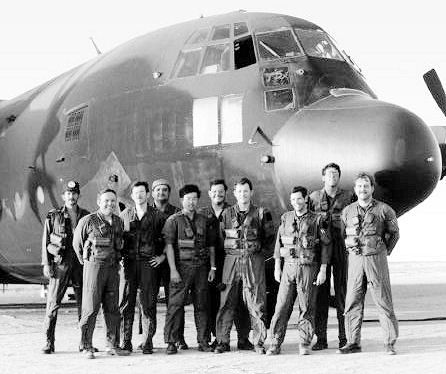
Photo of MC-130E, AF Ser. No. 64-0564, and "Dragon 2" crew just before departing for Desert One.

In 1978, the unrest in Iran against the pro-U.S. monarch, Shah Mohammad Reza Pahlavi, and his autocratic rule boiled over into a revolution. In January 1979, the Shah fled Iran to exile in Egypt and Iran was turned into an "Islamic Republic." On 22 October 1979, the Shah was allowed to travel to the United States for further medical treatment, causing widespread anger in Iran. Furious at what was called "evidence of American plotting" by the Iranian revolutionaries, the American Embassy in Tehran was taken over by a group of armed revolutionaries in violation of accepted diplomatic practices and international law, with the entire staff becoming hostages. While the situation was trying to be resolved through diplomatic means, no real progress was gained for the release of the hostages. In a bold plan, U.S. military forces were instructed to come up with a course of action to go into Iran and free the hostages by force of arms.

In April 1980, TAC air assets were deployed to areas close to Iran to be ready if and when Washington gave the "GO" signal. Operation Eagle Claw got underway on 24 April 1980 when USAF special operations MC-130 Combat Talon transport planes and Navy RH-53D Sea Stallion helicopters with Marine Corps flight crews deployed to Desert One, a small staging site inside Iran itself.

From the start, it appeared that the operation was running into problems. After launching from the aircraft carrier USS Nimitz (CVN-68), an unforeseen low-level sandstorm, also known as a haboob, caused two of eight helicopters to lose their way en route to Desert One, but only after men and equipment had been assembled there. A third helicopter suffered a mechanical failure and was incapable of continuing with the mission. Without enough helicopters to transport men and equipment to Desert Two, the mission was aborted. After the decision to abort the mission was made, one of the helicopters lost control while taking off and crashed into one of the MC-130s. In the ensuing explosion and fire, eight US servicemen were killed: five USAF aircrew in the MC-130, and three USMC aircrew in the RH-53. During the evacuation, six RH-53 helicopters were left behind intact.

The failure of the various services to work together with cohesion forced the establishment of new organizational structures within the services and eventually a new multi-service organization. In 1984, TAC transferred all of it special operations units, aircraft and personnel to Military Airlift Command (MAC) concurrent with MAC's establishment of 23rd Air Force as a dedicated organization for USAF special operations forces. This organization formed the foundation for what would later become Air Force Special Operations Command (AFSOC) in 1987. Also in 1987, the United States Special Operations Command (USSOCOM) was established at MacDill AFB, Florida as a joint-service force to coordinate the special operations forces for the Army, Navy and Air Force, with AFSOC as its USAF component command.

==== USAF Thunderbirds ====
For most of its history, the USAF Air Demonstration Squadron (USAF ADS), better known as the Thunderbirds, had flown front-line fighter aircraft, having been part of TAC since they moved to Nellis AFB, Nevada in the mid-1950s. In 1969, the team switched aircraft from the F-100 Super Sabre to the F-4 Phantom II. However, due to the 1973 oil crisis, the team only flew six air shows and was grounded for some time. In 1974, the Thunderbirds switched to the more economical T-38 Talon advanced jet trainer. The rationale for the change to a trainer was purely economical in an era of post-Vietnam fiscal austerity, since five T-38s used the same amount of fuel needed for one F-4 Phantom II. The switch to the T-38 also saw an alteration of the team's flight routine to exhibit the aircraft's maneuverability in tight turns.

In January 1982, a devastating accident during a training flight claimed the lives of four USAF ADS pilots at their primary practice facility, Indian Springs Air Force Auxiliary Field, northwest of Nellis AFB. While practicing the four-plane diamond loop, the formation impacted the ground at high speed, instantly killing all four pilots. The cause of the crash was officially listed as a result of pilot error by Thunderbird #1, the team leader, as he misjudged the proper altitude to execute the loop. The other three aircraft, following proper procedure, were looking at the Lead's aircraft, rather than the ground, and followed the Lead aircraft into the ground. The airshow season for that year was canceled and it was also decided to equip the squadron with the Block 15 F-16A/B Fighting Falcon and start over for 1983. In 1992, the squadron was upgraded to the Block 32 F-16C/D, and in 2009 to the Block 52 F-16C/D.

==== Fourth generation jet fighter aircraft ====
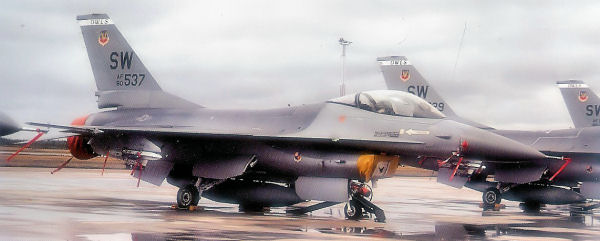
General Dynamics F-16A Block 10D Fighting Falcon, AF ser. No. 80-0537 of the 363 TFW at Shaw AFB, SC. This aircraft was later a static display at the Lockheed-Martin factory in Fort Worth, TX. On 19 March 2004 it was noted to be in use as a ground instructional airframe at NAS Fort Worth JRB (former Carswell AFB), TX.

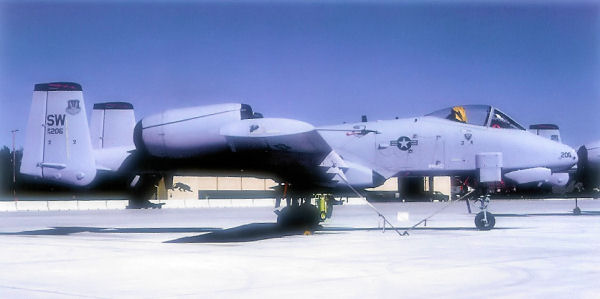
Fairchild Republic A-10A Thunderbolt II, AF Ser. No. 79-0206 of the 21st Fighter Squadron, Shaw AFB, SC, 29 September 1993.

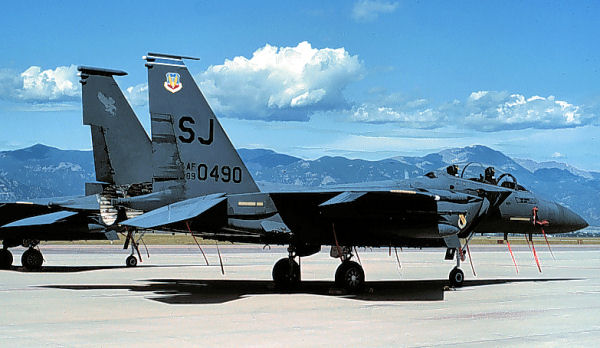
McDonnell Douglas F-15E-48-MC Strike Eagle, AF Ser. No. 89-0490 of the 4th Tactical Fighter Wing, Seymour Johnson AFB, NC.

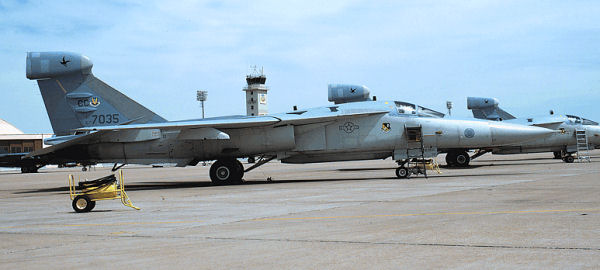
General Dynamics EF-111A, AF Ser. No. 67-0035 of the 429th/430th Electronic Combat Squadron, Cannon AFB, NM.

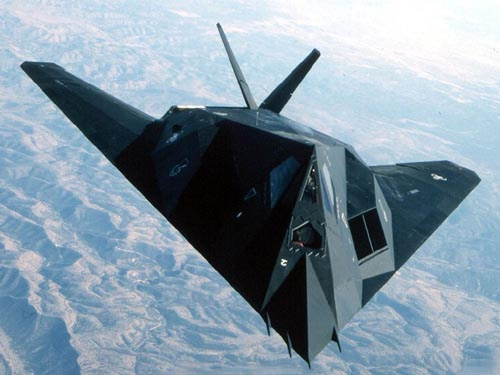
Lockheed F-117A of the 49 FW at Holloman AFB, NM.

The late 1970s through 1992 were a transition era for most TAC fighter wings, replacing their third generation Vietnam-Era fighter and attack aircraft such as the McDonnell Douglas F-4 Phantom II, General Dynamics F-111, and LTV A-7 Corsair II with fourth generation fighter aircraft like the McDonnell Douglas F-15 Eagle, General Dynamics F-16 Fighting Falcon and Fairchild Republic A-10 Thunderbolt II). The F-15A/B and subsequent F-15C/D were designed for the air superiority role, which was not really filled since the North American F-86 Sabre entered the USAF inventory in the 1950s. Conversely, the F-16 was designed for a multi-mission fighter-bomber role, replacing the F-4D/Es, while the A-10 was designed to fill the close air support mission of the A-7D.

Although developed and initially deployed in the late 1970s, budgetary constraints limited their deployment into the active duty forces. The Reagan Administration embarked on a massive overhaul of the United States armed forces and large numbers of these aircraft were ordered and deployed to front line active duty Air Force wings beginning in 1983.

The upgrade was not limited to first line USAF units, as beginning in 1985, Air National Guard (ANG) and Air Force Reserve (AFRES) units also began trading in their Vietnam Era aircraft for newer and more sophisticated weapons systems with F-16A/Bs being allocated to Guard and Reserve units as active duty Air Force units upgraded to the F-16C/Ds models. F-15A/B models of the 1970s were also provided to ANG squadrons when newer F-15C/D models reached front-line wings. As A-10s replaced A-7s, A-37s and OV-10s in the Regular Air Force, the A-7 and A-37 close air support aircraft, along with newly produced twin-seat A-7Ks, were flown by many ANG squadrons, often training with both Regular Army and Army National Guard combat units in ground support operations. The last A-7D/Ks were retired in 1993, being replaced in the ANG by A-10s and F-16C/Ds.

In 1984, a new version of the 1960s General Dynamics F-111 also began equipping select TAC and USAFE units. This version, known as the EF-111A Raven, was modified to carry electronic jamming units, its sole purpose being to fly into enemy airspace and confuse enemy radar so that the strike package could follow and accomplish the mission, replacing the venerable Douglas RB/EB-66 of the 1950s and 1960s that served in the Vietnam War.

A new version of the F-15, the F-15E Strike Eagle, was also developed to replace the F-111E/F tactical strike aircraft in TAC's and USAFE's arsenal. Developed from the twin-seat F-15B, the Strike Eagle was designed for long-range interdiction of enemy ground targets deep behind enemy lines while concurrently retaining air-to-air combat capability. The first F-15Es were deployed to the 4th Tactical Fighter Wing at Seymour Johnson AFB, North Carolina on 29 December 1988.

Across the Nevada desert skies in the 1980s, there were reports of strange lights in the night skies, with some of these reports explained as possible UFOs. Most of these reports seem to come from the area around Tonopah and another area identified on maps as Nellis AFB's Area 51. The UFO story seemed to hold water, as the USAF radars at Nellis and FAA radars at Las Vegas could not see any aircraft in the area of question. The strange lights over the Nevada desert were officially recognized in November 1988 when the Department of Defense unveiled the F-117 Nighthawk stealth aircraft, an outgrowth of USAF's Have Blue reduced radar cross-section (RCS) research aircraft. Although ostensibly designated as a "fighter," the F-117 was actually a precision light bomber with no air-to-air combat capability.

The F-117 was a well-kept secret throughout the 1980s. The first prototype aircraft had first flown in 1981 and one had crashed in June 1984 in the Nevada desert. It took another crash of the aircraft in California in 1988 to finally lift the veil of secrecy. On 9 May 1992, four Lockheed F-117A Nighthawks from the Tonopah Test Range Airport, Nevada, arrived at Holloman AFB, New Mexico and were assigned to the 49th Tactical Fighter Wing.

==== Collapse of the Warsaw Pact ====
One of the effects of this massive buildup of American military might during the 1980s was pressure inside of the Soviet Union to match the United States. However, internal pressures inside the Soviet Union for increased freedoms, along with economic pressures led to the loosening of their control in Eastern Europe. In 1989, one by one of these nations in Eastern Europe began to rebel against their Communist governments, leading to the opening of the Berlin Wall in November. The mighty Warsaw Pact as well as the Soviet Union was crumbling from within.

It was clear that the threat the western democracies faced in Europe was coming to an end as the Soviet Union imploded from within. As a result of the end of Cold War tensions, the United States began a period of downsizing the military. The Base Realignment and Closure (or BRAC) process was developed in an attempt to achieve the government's goal of closing and realigning military installations.

Through the BRAC process, numerous active duty, Air National Guard and Air Force Reserve bases and stations were marked for closing and units were inactivated. Beginning in 1988, some units became what were called "Super Wings," comprising more than one unit and aircraft type, along with several different missions. With all of the cutbacks it seemed that any type of major armed conflict was a thing of the past.

=== Operation Desert Shield/Desert Storm ===
In 1980, Tactical Air Command units of TAC's Ninth Air Force were allocated to President Jimmy Carter's Rapid Deployment Force, formally known as the Rapid Deployment Joint Task Force (RDJTF). In 1983, the RDJTF became a separate unified command known as the United States Central Command (USCENTCOM), focusing on the Middle East. Ninth Air Force, headquartered at Shaw AFB, South Carolina, provided the aircraft, personnel and materiel to form United States Central Command Air Forces (CENTAF), the USAF component command of USCENTCOM, which was also headquartered at Shaw AFB as a combined organization with 9th Air Force. Starting in 1981, Ninth Air Force aircraft and personnel were deployed to Egypt for Exercise BRIGHT STAR, an evolution that would continue biennially for the rest of the decade.

On 2 August 1990, ground forces of Iraq invaded Kuwait without warning. President George H. W. Bush proclaimed that the situation was not tolerable and with that he drew a what was referred to as "a line in the sand." The United States took their case to the United Nations, and the UN in turn condemned the actions of Iraq and proclaimed that they must withdraw. Iraq refused to withdraw from the small country, claiming it as being part of their sovereign territory. The United States, now backed by United Nations mandates, again told the Iraqi leadership to withdraw or suffer the results of continued aggression.

In response to the invasion, the largest military buildup since the Vietnam War commenced. By 15 August, the 1 TFW had deployed F-15Cs and F-15Ds in a fifteen-hour non-stop flight from their home station at Langley AFB, Virginia to Dhahran, Saudi Arabia. They were standing alert within hours of their arrival and Operation Desert Shield was underway.

By January 1991, numerous of TAC combat squadrons had been deployed as part of Desert Shield. Diplomacy had failed to resolve the situation and Iraq had been given the ultimatum, "...get out of Kuwait or suffer the wrath of the United Nations Coalition." Leaders from Iraq proclaimed that if the UN forces crossed into Iraqi territory they would suffer the "Mother of all battles," and as the deadline came and passed, there was no movement of Iraqi forces that indicated a pullback.

In the early morning hours of 17 January 1991, anti-aircraft batteries in Baghdad erupted as the first strikes by F-117A Nighthawks hit critical command and control targets in the Iraqi capital. Operation Desert Storm had begun.

During the next few hours, USAF tactical air assets, along with U.S. Navy, U.S. Marine Corps, Royal Air Force, French Air Force, Royal Saudi Air Force and Free Kuwait Air Force tactical aircraft, pounded command and control facilities, bridges, and other lines of communication. USAF Wild Weasel F-4Gs went after Iraqi SAM sites like they had in Vietnam, while USAF A-10s hunted Iraqi tanks and troops. In the first three days of the air war, eleven Iraqi aircraft were shot down by USAF F-15Cs.

During the six-week air war, any and all Iraqi military assets were targeted by Coalition attack aircraft. The Iraqis responded by launching Soviet-built SCUD ballistic missiles against targets in Israel and the Arabian peninsula. With no accurate guidance system, the SCUD missiles were very similar to the German V-2 rocket when it came to hitting a specific target. SCUDs that launched returned to earth with a chance of hitting something in the general area that it was pointed at. Classified as a terror weapon, the SCUDs became a top priority for TAC, USN/USMC and Coalition aircraft to find the mobile launching sites and destroy them.

The ground war began in late February 1991 and lasted approximately 100 hours. TAC close air support A-10 aircraft supported ground forces as they had trained for in the United States and Europe for well over a decade. Military planners and Washington officials were correct when they proclaimed that the war in the desert would "...not be another Viet Nam," and Desert Storm would go into the history books as one of TAC's most shining moments.

==== Known TAC units and aircraft deployed in Operation Desert Shield/Storm (1990–1991) ====
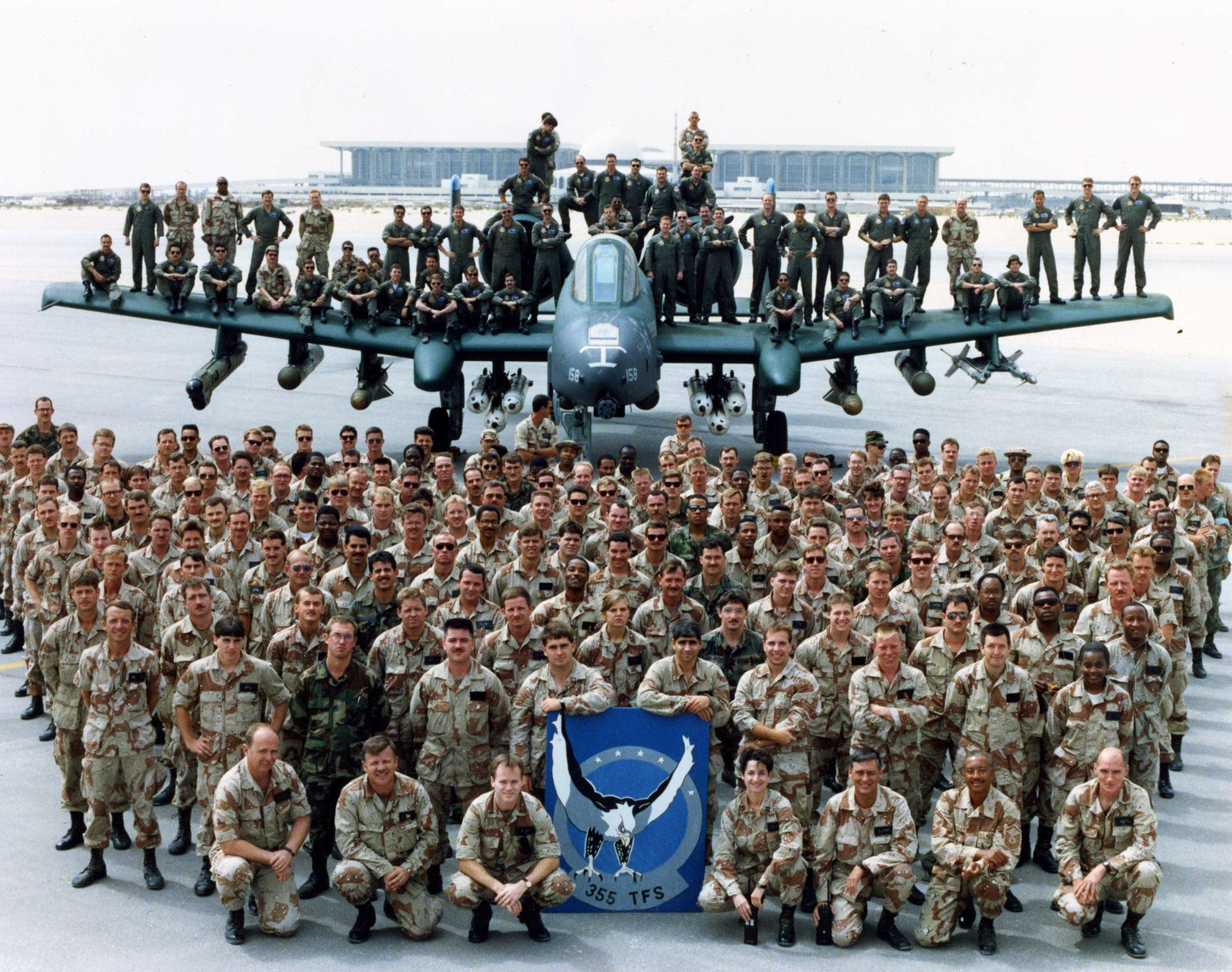
Group photo of the 355th Tactical Fighter Squadron Personnel from Myrtle Beach AFB South Carolina in March 1991 at King Fahd International Airport Saudi Arabia after the Coalition victory in Operation Desert Storm.

- 4th Tactical Fighter Squadron/388 TFW (F-16C/D) Hill AFB, UT
- 41st Electronic Combat Squadron /28th Air Division (EC-130H Compass Call) Davis-Monthan AFB, AZ
- 17th Tactical Fighter Squadron/363 TFW (F-16C/D) Shaw AFB, SC
- 23d Tactical Air Support Squadron/602 TACW (A-10A) Davis-Monthan AFB, AZ
- 27th Tactical Fighter Squadron/1 TFW (F-15C/D) Langley AFB, VA
- 33d Tactical Fighter Squadron/363 TFW (F-16C/D) Shaw AFB, SC
- 58th Tactical Fighter Squadron/33 TFW (F-15C/D) Eglin AFB, FL
- 69th Tactical Fighter Squadron/347 TFW (F-16C/D) Moody AFB, GA
- 71st Tactical Fighter Squadron/1 TFW (F-15C/D) Langley AFB, VA
- 74th Tactical Fighter Squadron/23 TFW (A-10A) England AFB, LA
- 76th Tactical Fighter Squadron/23 TFW (A-10A) England AFB, LA
- 335th Tactical Fighter Squadron/4 TFW (F-15E) Seymour Johnson AFB, NC
- 336th Tactical Fighter Squadron/4 TFW (F-15E) Seymour Johnson AFB, NC
- 353d Tactical Fighter Squadron/354 TFW (A-10A) Myrtle Beach AFB, SC
- 355th Tactical Fighter Squadron/354 TFW (A-10A) Myrtle Beach AFB, SC
- 390th Electronic Combat Squadron/366 TFW (EF-111A) Mountain Home AFB, ID
- 415th Tactical Fighter Squadron/37 TFW (F-117A) Tonopah Test Range Airport, NV
- 416th Tactical Fighter Squadron/37 TFW (F-117A) Tonopah Test Range Airport, NV
- 421st Tactical Fighter Squadron/388 TFW (F-16C/D) Hill AFB, UT
- 561st Tactical Fighter Squadron/35 TFW (F-4G) George AFB, CA
- 963rd Airborne Warning and Control Squadron/552 ACW (E-3B/C) Tinker AFB, OK
- 964th Airborne Warning and Control Squadron/552 ACW (E-3B/C) Tinker AFB, OK
- 965th Airborne Warning and Control Squadron/552 ACW (E-3B/C) Tinker AFB, OK
- 12th Tactical Reconnaissance Squadron/67 TRW (RF-4C) Bergstrom AFB, TX

(Does not include AFRES or ANG tactical flying units deployed from CONUS or USAF tactical flying units deployed from United States Air Forces in Europe)

=== Inactivation of Tactical Air Command and establishment of Air Combat Command ===
Operation Desert Storm was also the swan song for Tactical Air Command. The planning and execution of the mission was the result of 45 years of TAC being honed into one of the most effective military organizations in history. Following the 1991 Gulf War and the end of the Cold War, U.S. military planners perceived a serious blurring between the responsibilities of TAC and SAC. The collapse of the former Soviet Union and the end of the Cold War led senior defense planners to conclude that the structure of the military establishment which had evolved during the Cold War years was not suited to the new world situation. As shown by Desert Shield / Desert Storm, U.S. military forces would increasingly be called upon to participate in smaller-scale regional contingencies and humanitarian operations.

In a post-Cold War / post-Desert Storm environment, General Merrill A. McPeak, the then- Chief of Staff of the Air Force, envisioned a streamlined Air Force, eliminating superfluous organizational layers. General John M. Loh, who served as Vice Chief of Staff of the Air Force before becoming the commander of TAC on 26 March 1991, was heavily involved in the restructuring decisions. As a result, in the spring of 1992 the decision was made to merge most SAC resources with all of TAC's resources, while simultaneously reorganizing the Military Airlift Command (MAC). On 1 June 1992, Tactical Air Command (TAC), Strategic Air Command (SAC), and Military Airlift Command (MAC) were inactivated, being replaced by two new major commands, Air Combat Command (ACC) and Air Mobility Command (AMC). A brief ceremony at Langley AFB, Virginia marked the inactivation of TAC and the activation of ACC. General Loh, who had commanded TAC until its inactivation, became the first commander of ACC.

=== Lineage ===
- Established as Tactical Air Command and activated on 21 March 1946

Reduced from major command status, and assigned to Continental Air Command as a subordinate operational command, 1 December 1948
Returned to major command status. 1 December 1950
Inactivated on 1 June 1992

- Consolidated with Air Combat Command as Air Combat Command on 26 September 2016

=== Assignments ===
- HQ, United States Army Air Forces, 21 March 1946
- HQ, United States Air Force, 27 September 1947
- Continental Air Command, 1 December 1948
- HQ, United States Air Force, 1 December 1950 – 1 June 1992

=== Stations ===
Headquarters

- MacDill Field, Florida, 21 March 1946
- Langley AAF (later Langley AFB), Virginia, 26 May 1946 – 1 June 1992

=== Major components ===
==== Air Forces ====
- First Air Force, 6 December 1985 – 1 June 1992
- Ninth Air Force, 28 March 1946 – 1 December 1948; 1 December 1950 – 1 June 1992
- Twelfth Air Force, 17 May 1946 – 1 December 1948; 1 January 1958 – 1 June 1992
- Eighteenth Air Force, 28 March 1951 – 1 January 1958
- Nineteenth Air Force, 8 July 1955 – 2 July 1973
- Air Defense, Tactical Air Command, 1 October 1979 – 6 December 1985

==== Named Units/Air Divisions ====
- Air Forces Panama (830th Air Division), 1 January 1976 – 11 February 1992

- 831st Air Division (1957–1971; 1980–1991)

George AFB (Western United States)

- 832d Air Division (1957–1975; 1990–1991)

Cannon AFB (Southwestern United States)

- 833d Air Division (1964–1969; 1990–1991)

Seymour Johnson AFB (Mid-Atlantic United States)

- 834th Air Division (1957–1959)

England AFB (South Central United States)

- 835th Air Division (1964–1971)

McConnell AFB (Midwest United States)

- 836th Air Division (1957–1971; 1981–1992)

MacDill AFB (Southeast United States)

- 837th Air Division (1958–1963)

Shaw AFB, (Tactical Reconnaissance Wings)

- 838th Air Division (1957–1969)

Forbes AFB (Troop Carrier Wings)

- 839th Air Division (1957–1974)

Sewart AFB (Troop Carrier/Tactical Airlift Wings)

- 840th Air Division (1964–1969)

Lockbourne AFB (Troop Carrier/Tactical Airlift Wings)

=== Major Aircraft ===
- Fighters / Attack / Reconnaissance

Douglas A-1 Skyraider
Ling-Temco-Vought A-7 Corsair II
Fairchild-Republic A-10/OA-10 Thunderbolt II
Cessna A-37 Dragonfly
McDonnell Douglas F-4/RF-4 Phantom II
Northrop F-5 Freedom Fighter
McDonnell Douglas F-15 Eagle
McDonnell Douglas F-15E Strike Eagle
General Dynamics F-16 Fighting Falcon
North American P-51/F-51 Mustang
Lockheed P-80/F-80/RF-80 Shooting Star
Republic P-47/F-47 Thunderbolt
Republic Aviation F-84/RF-84 Thunderjet
North American F-82 Twin Mustang
North American F-86 Sabre
North American F-100 Super Sabre
McDonnell F-101/RF-101 Voodoo
Lockheed F-104 Starfighter
Republic F-105 Thunderchief
Convair F-106 Delta Dart
General Dynamics F-111

- Trainers

North American T-6 Texan
North American T-28 Trojan
Convair T-29
Lockheed T-33 Shooting Star
Northrop T-38 Talon

- Observation

Cessna O-1 Bird Dog
Cessna O-2 Skymaster
North American OV-10 Bronco

- Cargo/Transports/Attack/Electronic Warfare/Special Mission

de Havilland Canada C-7 Caribou
Douglas C-47/AC-47/EC-47 Skytrain
Fairchild C-82 Packet
Fairchild C-119/AC-119 Flying Boxcar
General Dynamics EF-111
Lockheed EC-121 Warning Star
Fairchild C-123 Provider
Lockheed C-130/AC-130/EC-130/
MC-130 Hercules
Boeing E-3 AWACS
Boeing EC-135 AW&CP
Boeing E-8 Joint STARS

- Bombers

Douglas B-29/RB-26/A-26 Invader
Martin B-57/RB-57 Canberra
Douglas B-66/RB-66/EB-66 Destroyer
Lockheed F-117A Nighthawk

- Tankers

Boeing KB-29 Superfortress
Boeing KB-50 Superfortress
Boeing KC-97 Stratofreighter

- Helicopters

Bell UH-1 Huey
Hiller OH-23 Raven
Hughes H-6
Sikorsky MH-53H/MH-53J/MH-53M Pave Low
Sikorsky HH-60G Pave Hawk
Sikorsky H-19 Chickasaw
Sikorsky H-5
Sikorsky R-4
Sikorsky S-62
Sikorsky UH-60 Black Hawk

P-series (Pursuit) designation changed to F-series (Fighter) designation in 1947.
Source for lineage, assignments, stations, components, aircraft

== See also ==
- List of commanders of Tactical Air Command
