= Old soldiers never die (disambiguation) =

Old soldiers never die is an English language catchphrase.

Old Soldiers Never Die may also refer to:

- Old Soldiers Never Die, a 1931 British comedy film
- Old Soldiers Never Die, a 1933 memoir of Francis Philip Woodruff
- Old Soldiers Never Die, a 1951 single by Vaughn Monroe
- The "Old Soldiers Never Die" speech, the farewell address to the U.S. Congress of general Douglas MacArthur
- Old Soldiers Never Die: The Life of Douglas MacArthur, a 1996 book by Geoffrey Perret
- Old Soldiers Never Die, a 1973 record by Heads Hands & Feet
- Old Soldiers Never Die, a 1969 installation of sitcom Never Mind the Quality, Feel the Width
