= Aftermath of the Korean War =

Events following the conclusion of the Korean War

The aftermath of the Korean War set the tone for Cold War tension between superpowers. The Korean War was important in the development of the Cold War, as it showed that the two superpowers, United States and Soviet Union, could fight a "limited war" in a third country. The "limited war" or "proxy war" strategy was a feature of conflicts such as the Vietnam War and the Soviet War in Afghanistan, as well as wars in Angola, Greece, and the Middle East.

In the aftermath of the war, the United States funneled significant aid to South Korea under the auspices of the United Nations Korean Reconstruction Agency. Concomitantly, North Korean reconstruction was assisted by "fraternal socialist nations:" the Soviet Union and China. In the years immediately following the war, North Korea's growth rate of total industrial output exceeded South Korea's and averaged 39% between 1953 and 1960.

== Background ==
The Korean War was the first war in which the United Nations (UN) participated outside the Western world. The UN Command in South Korea is still functional.

Around June 1950, the Korean War became an international crisis, as it made communist and capitalist countries around the world go against each other. By the end of World War II, the Soviet Union sought to spread communism to other nations and did so by providing political, logistical, and diplomatic support and assisted in the plans to invade South Korea. The Soviets provided military training for North Korean and Chinese troops.

In response, the United States, fearing that the Soviets would control and spread communism to the entire Korean Peninsula and South Pacific, sent troops into South Korea to support its military forces. Those actions quickly escalated into other countries. The UN supported the south, and China supported the north. Both sides got involved in the conflict. Kim Il Sung’s invasion solved a number of critical problems for the Truman administration, and did wonders in building the American Cold War position on a world scale.

The war devastated both North and South Korea. Both suffered major damage to their economies and infrastructure, as a result of bombings, artillery strikes and loss of life, including military personnel and civilians.

== North Korea ==
As a result of the war, "North Korea had been virtually destroyed as an industrial society". After the armistice, Kim Il Sung requested Soviet economic and industrial assistance. In September 1953, the Soviet government agreed to "cancel or postpone repayment for all ... outstanding debts", and promised to grant North Korea one billion rubles in monetary aid, industrial equipment and consumer goods. Eastern European members of the Soviet Bloc also contributed with "logistical support, technical aid, [and] medical supplies". China canceled North Korea's war debts, provided 800 million yuan, promised trade cooperation and sent in thousands of troops to rebuild damaged infrastructure. Contemporary North Korea remains underdeveloped and continues to be a totalitarian dictatorship since the end of the war, with an elaborate cult of personality around the Kim dynasty.

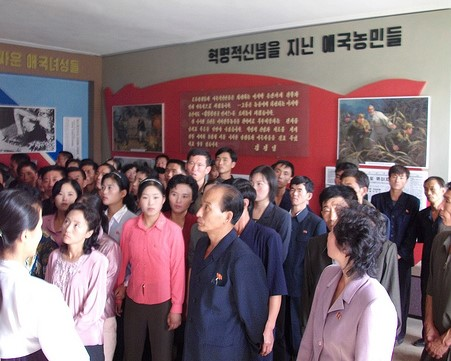
North Koreans touring the Museum of American War Atrocities in 2009

The means of production are owned by the state through state-run enterprises and collectivized farms. Most services—such as healthcare, education, housing and food production—are subsidized or state-funded. Estimates based on the most recent North Korean census suggest that 240,000 to 420,000 people died as a result of the 1990s North Korean famine and that there were 600,000 to 850,000 unnatural deaths in North Korea from 1993 to 2008. A study by South Korean anthropologists of North Korean children who had defected to China found that 18-year-old males were 13 cm (5 in) shorter than South Koreans their age because of malnutrition.

Present-day North Korea has the highest number of military and paramilitary personnel in the world, with 7,769,000 active, reserve and paramilitary personnel, or approximately 30% of its population. Its active-duty army of 1.28 million is the fourth largest in the world, after China, the United States and India; consisting of 4.9% of its population. North Korea possesses nuclear weapons.

A 2014 UN inquiry into abuses of human rights in North Korea concluded that, "the gravity, scale and nature of these violations reveal a state that does not have any parallel in the contemporary world," with Amnesty International and Human Rights Watch holding similar views.

== South Korea ==
South Korea, which started from a far lower industrial base than North Korea (the latter contained 80% of Korea's heavy industry in 1945), stagnated in the first postwar decade. In 1953, South Korea and the United States signed a Mutual Defense Treaty. In 1960, the April Revolution occurred and students joined an anti-Syngman Rhee demonstration; 142 were killed by police; in consequence, Syngman Rhee resigned and left for exile in the United States. Park Chung Hee's May 16 coup enabled social stability. From 1965 to 1973, South Korea dispatched troops to South Vietnam and received $235,560,000 in allowance and military procurement from the United States. The gross national product increased fivefold during the Vietnam War. South Korea had one of the world's fastest-growing economies from the early 1960s to the mid-1990s.

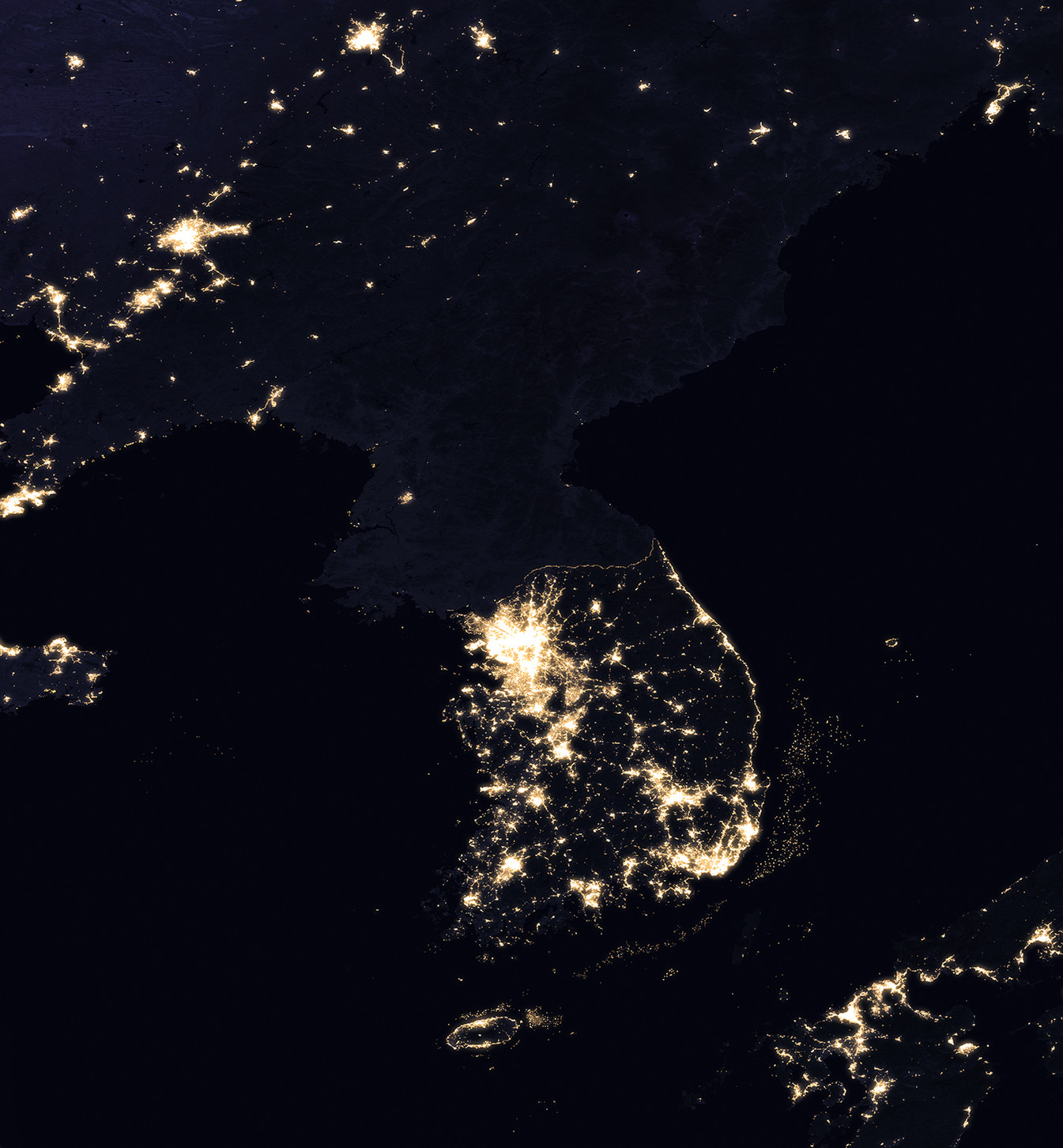
The Korean Peninsula at night, shown in a 2017 composite photograph from NASA

South Korean anti-Americanism after the war was fueled by the presence and behavior of United States Forces Korea military personnel and U.S. support for Park's authoritarian regime, a fact still evident during the country's democratic transition in the 1980s. However, anti-Americanism has declined significantly in South Korea in recent years, from 46% favorable in 2003 to 74% favorable in 2011, making South Korea one of the most pro-U.S. countries in the world.

A large number of mixed-race "GI babies" (offspring of U.S. and other UN soldiers and Korean women) were filling up the country's orphanages. Because Korean traditional society places significant weight on paternal family ties, bloodlines, and purity of race, children of mixed race or those without fathers are not easily accepted in South Korean society. International adoption of Korean children began in 1954. The U.S. Immigration Act of 1952 legalized the naturalization of non-Blacks and non-Whites as U.S. citizens and made possible the entry of military spouses and children from South Korea. With the passage of the Immigration Act of 1965, which substantially changed U.S. immigration policy toward non-Europeans, Koreans became one of the fastest-growing Asian groups in the United States.

== Other involved nations ==
=== Australia ===
From 1950 to 1953, 17,000 Australians fought as part of the United Nations multinational forces. As the war continued, several other nations grew less willing to contribute more ground troops. Australia, however, increased its troop strength in Korea.

After the war ended, Australians remained in Korea for four years as military observers. Australia gained political and security benefits, the most significant being the signing of the ANZUS Treaty with the United States and New Zealand.

=== Canada ===
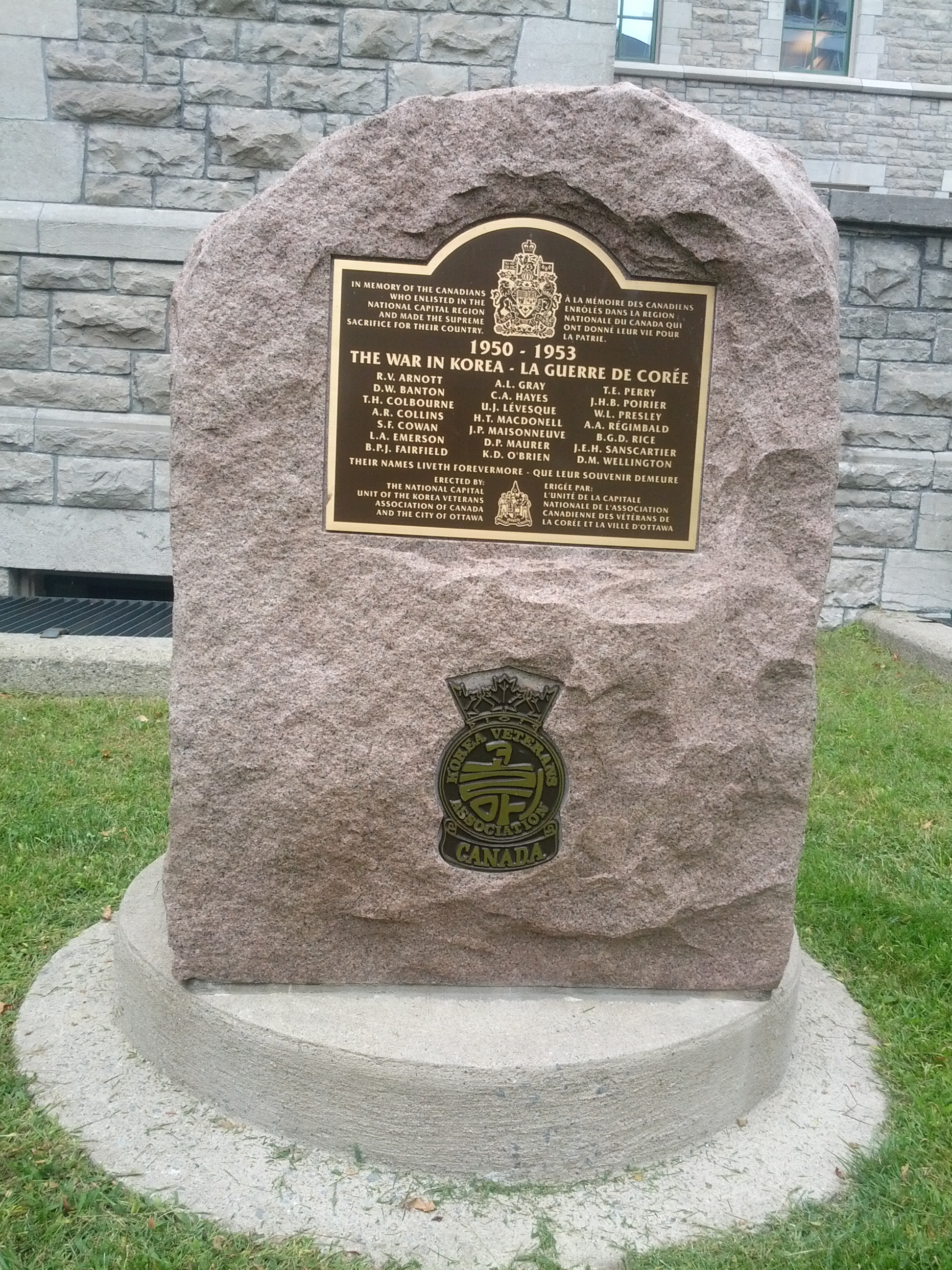
Memorial in Ottawa

Canada sent 29,791 troops to the war, with 7,000 more remaining to supervise the ceasefire until the end of 1955. Of these 1,558 became casualties, including 516 deaths, most of them through combat.

The Canadian military was revitalized as a result of the Korean War. A changeover to U.S.-designed weapons and equipment had been planned for the 1950s, but the emergency in Korea forced the use of war stocks of British-designed weapons from World War II. In the late 1950s, Canada adopted a variety of weapons.

The Korean War was the last major conflict Canadian forces participated in until the 1991 Persian Gulf War, and the last major combat by ground troops until 2002 in Afghanistan. Canada played a minor role in the fighting in Cyprus in 1974 and in the Balkans at Medak Pocket in the 1990s.

=== France ===
At a time of political difficulties due to lack of cabinet members and a prime minister, the French government eventually provided military support to South Korea by sending over the French Army's bataillon français De l'ONU of over 3,000 soldiers and sailors. This battalion played a significant role in defending the 38th parallel on the Korean Peninsula and the South Korean capital city Seoul between 1950 and 1954. The French at the time were worried that if they failed in their efforts it would harm future relations between them, Indochina and the UN.

=== India ===
During this time India was newly independent from British rule and viewed the Korean conflict as a motivation and also a threat. During the Cold War New Delhi became more concerned of India's well-being because of the spread of communism and the constant support of the USSR and China to North Korea. These events could lead to communist influence getting to India. India supported the UN Security Council in the avocation of the power of unity among the major powers to work together towards a solution of the conflict.

=== Japan ===
As American occupation armies were dispatched to the Korean peninsula, Japan's security became problematic. Under United States guidance, Japan established Reserved Police, later the Japan Self-Defense Forces (自衛隊). The signing of the Treaty of Peace with Japan (日本国との平和条約; popularly known as the Treaty of San Francisco) was also hastened to return Japan back into international communities. In the eyes of some American policy makers, the non-belligerency clause in the Constitution was already being considered a "mistake" by 1953.

Economically, Japan was able to benefit vastly from the war, and the Korean War greatly helped the rise of Japan's economy and its development into a world power. American requirements for supplies were organized through a Special Procurements system, which allowed for local purchases without the complex Pentagon procurement system. Over $3.5 billion was spent on Japanese companies, peaking at $809 million in 1953, and the zaibatsu went from being distrusted to being encouraged. Among those who thrived not only on orders from the military but also through American industrial experts, including W. Edwards Deming were Mitsui, Mitsubishi, and Sumitomo. Japanese manufacturing grew by 50% between March 1950 and 1951, and by 1952, pre-war standards of living were reached and output was twice the level of 1949. Becoming an independent country after the Treaty of San Francisco saved Japan from the burden of expense of the occupation forces.

During the war, 200,000 to 400,000 Koreans fled to Japan relying on relatives already living in Japan to provide them with shelters and necessary paperwork to live legally. They joined with those having fled from Jeju and formed the largest post-World War II Korean population group in Japan. While they initially had no strong political alignment, they were eventually split into factions supporting either North or South Korea with few holding on to the ideal of unified Korea.

=== People's Republic of China ===
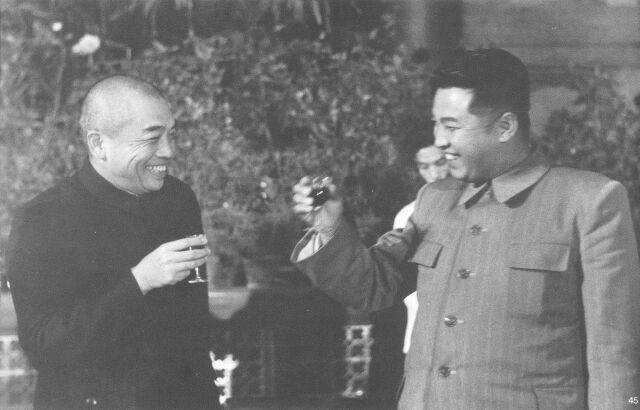
Peng Dehuai toasting Kim Il Sung in 1955

The war was a military disaster for the People’s Republic of China. The PRC had sent some of its best units to join the war. Although the People's Liberation Army (PLA) had some initial success, losses (both on the battlefield as well as in material and casualties) exposed the PLA's weaknesses in firepower, air support, logistics, and communication. Mao lost his own son Mao Anying in the war. As a result, the PLA was given a new mandate to modernize and professionalize itself. This ran counter to the PLA's previous mandate that put dogma before expertise and modernization. The commander of the PVA's forces in Korea during the war, marshal Peng Dehuai, was made the government's first Minister of National Defense to implement the changes and reforms such as modernization of weaponry, training and discipline, the rank system, and conscription.

China successfully prevented the South Korean and U.S. militaries from establishing a presence on its Manchurian border. At that time, Manchuria, especially Liaoning – the Chinese province north of the Yalu River – was China's most important industrial center. Protecting the Manchurian industrial zone was one of the major reasons China entered the war. Furthermore, by supporting the North Korean state, China obtained more than 300 km of strategic buffer zone from the U.S. which would avoid the military spending necessary to protect its Korean border for the next 50 years.

During the war, over an estimate number of 21,800 Chinese troops were taken prisoner by the Allies. After the war, they were given a chance to return to the People's Republic of China or to go to the Republic of China (Taiwan). Over two thirds chose to go to Taiwan for fear of government reprisal, consequently defecting to the Army of the Republic of China.

The war also partly contributed to the decline of Sino-Soviet relations. Although the Chinese had their reasons to enter the war, the view that the Soviets had used them as proxies was shared by the Western Bloc. General Douglas MacArthur was a notable exception, dissenting from this prevailing view in his "Old Soldiers Never Die" speech. China had to use a Soviet loan, which had been originally intended to rebuild their destroyed economy, to pay for Soviet arms.

Mao Zedong's decision to take on the United States was a direct attempt to confront what the communist bloc viewed as the strongest anti-communist power in the world, undertaken at a time when the Chinese communist regime was still consolidating its own power after winning the Chinese Civil War. Mao supported intervention not to save North Korea, but because he believed that a military conflict with the U.S. was inevitable after the U.S. entered the war, and to appease the Soviet Union to secure military dispensation and achieve Mao's goal of making China a major world military power. Mao was equally ambitious in improving his own prestige inside the communist international community by demonstrating that his Marxist concerns were international. In his later years, Mao believed that Joseph Stalin only gained a positive opinion of him after China's entrance into the Korean War. Inside mainland China, the war improved the long-term prestige of Mao, Zhou Enlai, and Peng Dehuai, allowing the Chinese Communist Party to increase its legitimacy while weakening anti-communist dissent.

The Chinese government has encouraged the viewpoint that the war was initiated by the United States and South Korea, though ComIntern documents have shown that Mao sought approval from Stalin to enter the war. In Chinese media, the Chinese war effort is considered as an example of China's engaging the strongest power in the world with an underequipped army, forcing it to retreat, and fighting it to a military stalemate. These successes were contrasted with China's historical humiliations by Japan and by Western powers over the previous hundred years, highlighting the abilities of the PLA and the Chinese Communist Party. China became viewed as the strongest military power in Asia.

The most significant negative long-term consequence of the war for China was that it led the United States to guarantee the safety of Chiang Kai-shek's regime in Taiwan, effectively ensuring that Taiwan would remain outside of PRC control through the present day. Mao had also discovered the usefulness of large-scale mass movements in the war while implementing them among most of his ruling measures over PRC. Anti-U.S. sentiments, which were already a significant factor during the Chinese Civil War, were ingrained into Chinese culture during the communist propaganda campaigns of the Korean War.

=== Republic of China (Taiwan) ===
Korea played an important role in sustaining the ROC's economic stability. Until the war in Korea, the U.S. had largely abandoned the Nationalist government of Generalissimo Chiang Kai-shek, whose forces had retreated to Taiwan after their defeat at the hands of Mao's communists in the Chinese Civil War. Indeed, the U.S. had little involvement in that conflict, beyond supplying surplus material to the Nationalists. However, the PRC's involvement in the Korean War rendered any U.S. policy that would have allowed Taiwan to fall under PRC control untenable. This saw the abandonment of the American policy to let Taiwan join the communist Chinese state, the policy which existed prior to the war. Truman's decision to send American warships to the Formosa Strait as well as an increase in aid in order to deter the PRC from making any attempt to invade Taiwan, after doing nothing to prevent the Nationalists' mainland defeat in the first place, is evidence of this.

The anti-communist atmosphere in the West in response to the Korean War contributed to the unwillingness to diplomatically recognize the People's Republic of China until the 1970s. In that time, the ROC was recognized by the U.S. as the legitimate Chinese government, and that in turn allowed Taiwan to develop politically, militarily, and economically. The result has been that, today, any effort by the PRC to invade the island, or otherwise coerce the people there into an arrangement of political unity with the communist controlled mainland, would be difficult at best to accomplish, and may be impossible without a great deal of bloodshed. While economic ties between the PRC and ROC have grown immensely since the 1990s, thus achieving a degree of interdependency that would have been unimaginable even 20 years ago; political diplomacy between the ROC and mainland China remains strained, and successive governments in Taiwan have consistently, if sometimes obliquely, signaled their determination to remain independent for the foreseeable future.

North Korean defectors arrived in Taiwan on January 23, 1954, and were immediately celebrated as "Anti-Communist Heroes". The ROC government declared January 23 as World Freedom Day in their honor.

=== Soviet Union / Russian Federation ===
The war was a political disaster for the Soviet Union. Its central objective—the unification of the Korean peninsula under the Kim Il Sung regime—was not achieved. Boundaries of both parts of Korea remained practically unchanged. Furthermore, relations with communist ally China were seriously and permanently spoiled, leading to the Sino-Soviet split that lasted until the collapse of the Soviet Union in 1991.

The United States' strong resistance to the invasion may have prevented a Soviet intervention in Yugoslavia during the Tito–Stalin split. The war, meanwhile, united Western Bloc countries: the Korean War accelerated the conclusion of a peace agreement between the U.S. and Japan, the warming of West Germany's relations with other western countries, and the creation of military and political blocs ANZUS (1951), SEATO (1954) and CENTO (1955). However, because of the war, the authority of the Soviet state grew, which showed in its readiness to interfere in developing countries of the Third World, many of which after the Korean War went down the socialist path of development, after selecting the Soviet Union as their patron. In 1955, the Warsaw Pact was also created under Soviet direction and control.

Despite the expenses and regardless of who paid them, the Korean War provided approximately 30,000 Soviet military personnel valuable experience in war. The conflict allowed the Soviets the opportunity to test several new forms of armament, in particular the MiG-15 combat aircraft. Furthermore, numerous models of American military equipment were captured, which made it possible for Soviet engineers and scientists to reverse engineer American technology and use what they learned for the development of new forms of their own armaments. According to declassified Soviet documents released after the fall of the USSR, Stalin may have been the main obstacle for peace in Korea specifically because of the intelligence gathered on the American war machine, and the testing of new Soviet military equipment during the conflict.

After the dissolution of the Soviet Union in 1991, North Korea's relations with the Soviet Union's successor state, the Russian Federation began to improve by the turn of the century after the rise of Vladimir Putin in 2000. North Korean troops began to be deployed in Western Russia since 2024 during Russia's invasion of Ukraine that began in 2022.

=== Turkey ===
During World War II, Turkey maintained a neutral stance. It was decided by the Allies at the Second Cairo Conference that maintaining Turkey's neutrality would serve their interests, by blocking the Axis from reaching the strategic oil reserves of the Middle East. Unfortunately, and although Turkey eventually declared war on the Axis powers in 1945, this decision had the side-effect of leaving the country somewhat isolated in the diplomatic arena after the war. By the beginning of the 1950s, Turkey was under pressure from the Soviet Union on territorial issues, particularly regarding the control of the Turkish Straits. Looking for an ally against the Soviets, Turkey sought to join the NATO alliance, and the Korean War was viewed as an opportunity to show Turkey's good intention.

Turkey was one of the larger participants in the U.N. alliance, committing nearly 5,500 troops. The Turkish Brigade, which operated under the U.S. 25th Infantry Division, assisted in protecting the supply lines of U.N. forces which advanced towards North Korea. However, it was the Battles of Wawon and Kumyanjangni that earned the Turkish Brigade a reputation and the praise of U.N. forces. Because of their actions in these battles, a monument was created in Seoul in the memory of the Turkish soldiers who fought in Korea.

Turkey's involvement was a controversial topic in Turkey at the time and continues to be so today. While sending troops to Korea earned Turkey the respect of the West, it was also the beginning of more overt clashes with the Eastern Bloc. Prime Minister Adnan Menderes was criticized for sending troops without asking the parliament first. While Turkey's performance is considered by many citizens as one of the most noble episodes of the country's recent history, some also believe that sending the country's soldiers to die for the interests of the "imperialist powers" was one of the most misguided foreign policy decisions ever made by the Turkish Republic.

Nevertheless, Turkey's entrance into the war as part of the U.N. command did indeed have a great impact on earning a place in NATO. Turkey's participation also laid the foundation bilateral diplomatic and trade relations with South Korea.

=== United Kingdom ===
The war had adverse economic consequences for the United Kingdom, triggering a massive rearmament program that drained resources, caused severe raw material shortages, and fueled high inflation. It derailed Britain's post-World War II export-led recovery, forcing the government to revive wartime austerity and restrict consumption. Approximately 100,000 British troops fought in the Korean war. This was the last time such large numbers of British troops were deployed overseas. Their significant involvement was the Battle of the Imjin River against Chinese soldiers. 600 soldiers of the British Army combated a force of 30,000 Chinese troops crossing the Imjin River in Korea in 1951. At the end of the battle 10,000 Chinese troops had fallen. The U.K. only suffered about 59 casualties. This battle was a turning point in the war as it stopped the Chinese advance. The Gloucester Valley Battle Monument is a memorial for British soldiers killed at Solma-Ri, South Korea. 1,078 British soldiers died fighting in the Korean war. On the homefront, the war was unpopular.

=== United States ===
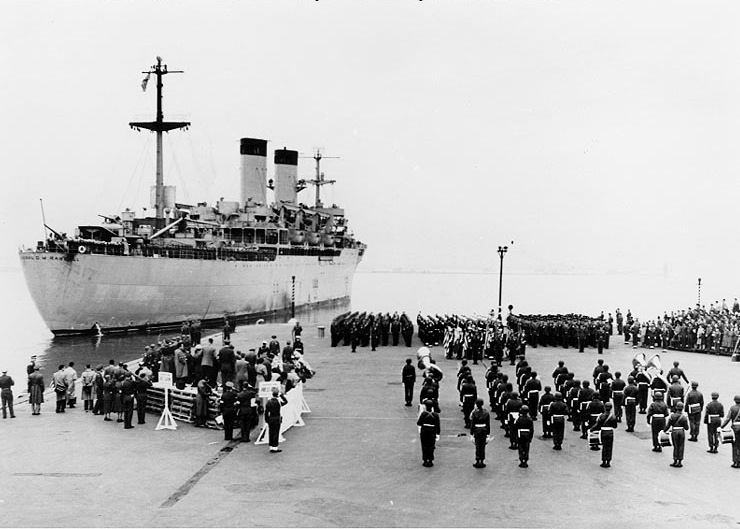
The first American war dead were brought home aboard the USNS Randall, shown here departing Yokohama on March 11, 1951.

The war was also a political disaster for the United States and brought the presidency of Harry S. Truman to a conclusion. The Defense Department estimated that the United States spent US$15 billion (equivalent to $181B in 2025) on the Korean War. The American defense budget had nearly quadrupled during this period, and high levels of expenditures were even maintained after 1953.

President Truman declared a state of national emergency at the outset of the war in December 1950 during which the penalties under numerous federal statutes were automatically escalated. Although the emergency has long since abated, the federal courts have continued to enforce those penalties into the 21st century for acts that occurred while the emergency was at its height.

Racial integration efforts in the U.S. military began during the Korean War, where African Americans fought in integrated units for the first time. President Truman signed Executive Order 9981 on July 26, 1948, calling on the armed forces to provide equal treatment and opportunity for black servicemen. The extent to which Truman's 1948 orders were carried out varied among the various branches of the military, with segregated units still in deployment at the start of the war, and eventually being integrated towards the end of the war. The last large segregated operational unit was the U.S. 24th Infantry Regiment which was deactivated on October 1, 1951.

American Christian soldiers and military personnel proselytized to Koreans during and after the war.

There has been some confusion over the previously reported number of 54,589 Korean War deaths. In 1993, this number was divided by the Defense Department into 33,686 battle deaths, 2,830 non-battle deaths, and 17,730 deaths of Defense Department personnel outside the Korean theatre. There were also 8,142 U.S. personnel listed as Missing In Action (MIA) during the war. U.S. casualties in the war are fewer than in the Vietnam War, but they occurred over three years as opposed to 15 years (1960 to 1975) in Vietnam. However, advances in medical services such as the Mobile Army Surgical Hospital and the use of rapid transport of the wounded to them such as with helicopters led to a lower death rate for U.N. forces than in previous wars.

For service during the Korean War, the U.S. military issued the Korean Service Medal. However, many still-living Korean War veterans claim that their country tends to neglect the remembrance of this war. With more overt displays made for World War II, the Vietnam War, the Persian Gulf War, the War in Afghanistan, and the Iraq war, the Korean War has come to be dubbed by some as the "Forgotten war" or the "Unknown War." As a partial remedy, the Korean War Veterans Memorial was built in Washington, D.C., and dedicated to veterans of the war on July 27, 1995.

The U.S. still maintains a heavy military presence in Korea, as part of the effort to uphold the Korean Armistice Agreement between South and North Korea.

== See also ==
- Korean conflict
- Neutral Nations Supervisory Commission
- Korean DMZ Conflict (1966–69)
- Recovery of U.S. human remains from the Korean War

== Sources ==
- Barnouin, Barbara; Yu, Changgeng (2006). Zhou Enlai: A Political Life. Hong Kong: Chinese University Press. ISBN 978-9629962807.
