= Old soldiers never die =

English language catchphrase

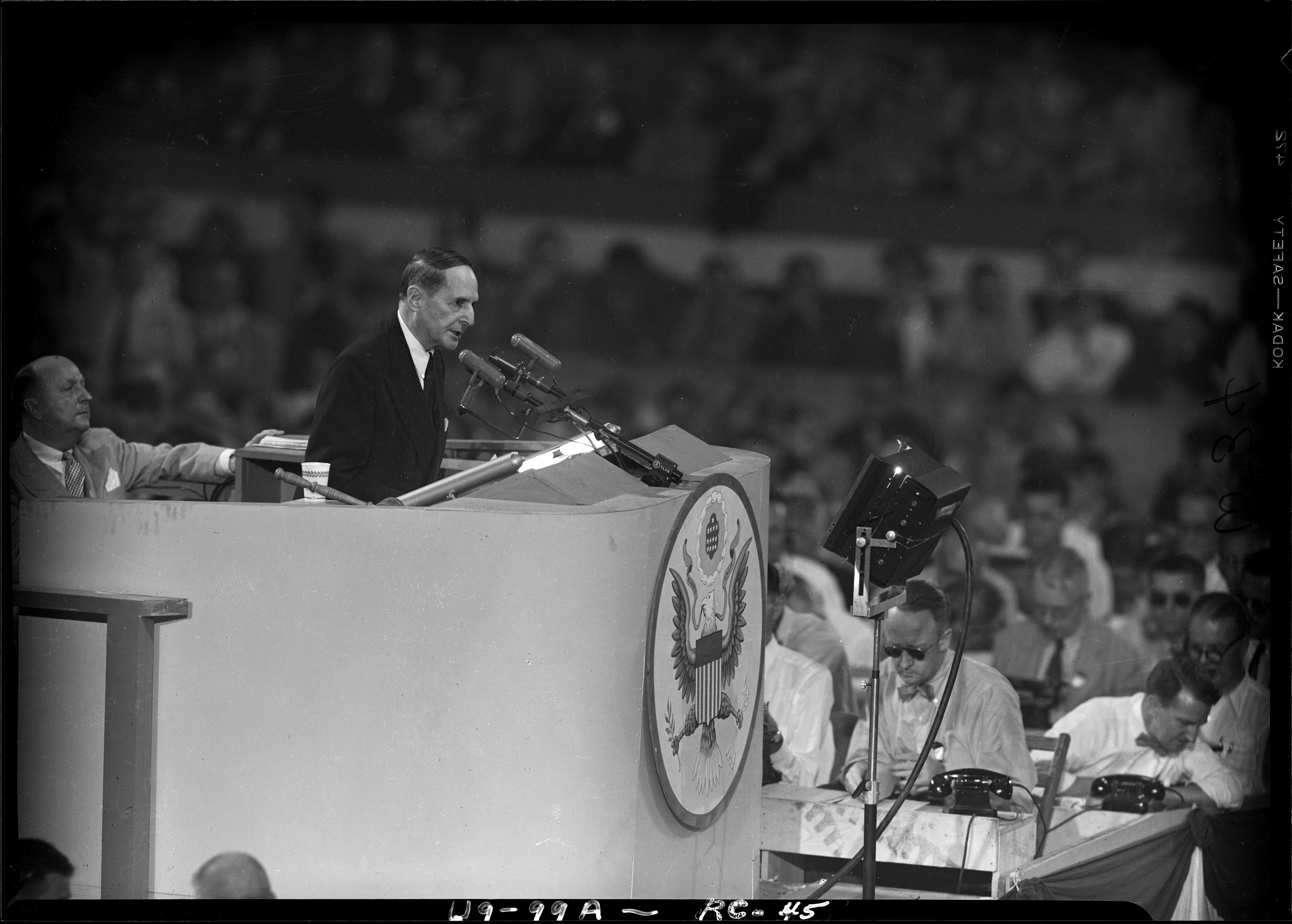
- Douglas MacArthur speaking from the podium
- Date: April 19, 1951; 75 years ago
- Venue: United States Capitol
- Type: Speech
- Cause: Korean War
- Motive: Farewell speech and to rally support against communism in the Pacific
- Website: www.americanrhetoric.com/speeches/douglasmacarthurfarewelladdress.htm

"Old soldiers never die" is an English language catchphrase, with the full version being "Old soldiers never die, they simply fade away". It originates from a stanza from the soldiers' folklore song Old Soldiers Never Die:

Old soldiers never die,
Never die, never die,
Old soldiers never die,
They simply fade away.

The song itself is a British Army parody of the gospel song Kind Words Can Never Die.

In the United States, the phrase was used by General Douglas MacArthur in his April 19, 1951 farewell address to the U.S. Congress (which has become known as the "Old Soldiers Never Die" speech):

... but I still remember the refrain of one of the most popular barrack ballads of that day which proclaimed most proudly that "old soldiers never die; they just fade away."

And like the old soldier of that ballad, I now close my military career and just fade away, an old soldier who tried to do his duty as God gave him the light to see that duty.

The phrase generated a host of joke snowclones, such as:

- Old programmers never die, they just branch to a new address.
- Old policemen never die, they just cop out.
- Old pilots never die, they just go to a higher plane.
- Old fishermen never die, they just smell that way.

The joke has been applied in other military contexts, such as the title of a paper presented at a 1996 IEEE conference on radar systems: Old radar types never die, they just phased array.

In a 1980 interview with Barbara Walters on ABC's program 20/20, former president Richard Nixon paraphrased MacArthur and the catchphrase for himself by saying "Old politicians usually die, but they never fade away."

In Sting's 2016 album 57th & 9th, the second single, "50,000", contains the line of verse "Rock stars don't ever die, they only fade away" as a tribute to Prince, David Bowie, Glenn Frey, and Lemmy Kilmister.

The song was recorded by Bing Crosby during a broadcast of his radio show in 1951 and later released on Decca Records.
