= McCoy Air Force Base =

US base by Orlando, Florida (1940–47; 1951-1975)

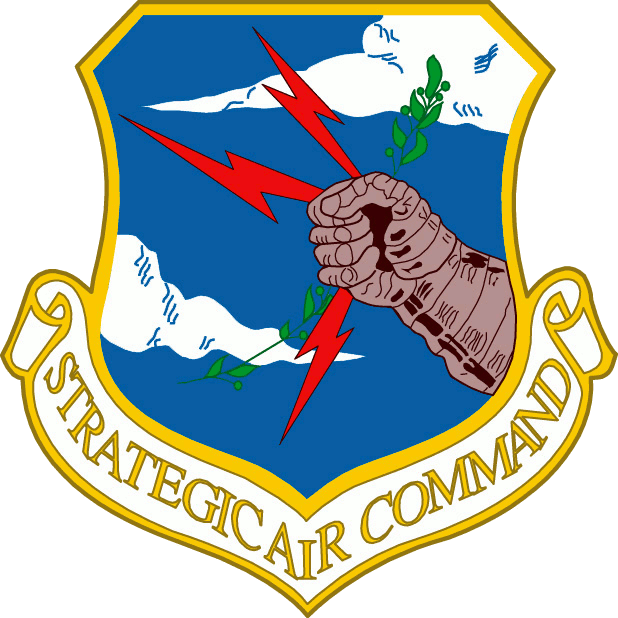
McCoy Air Force Base
- Part of Strategic Air Command
- Orlando, Florida
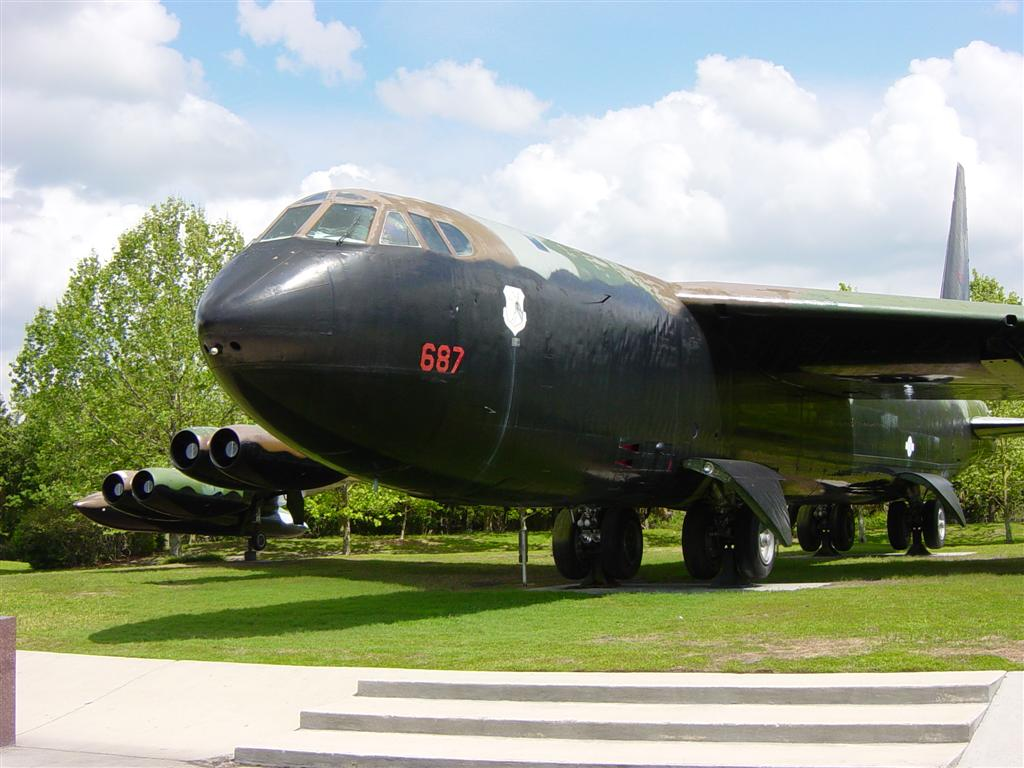
- Boeing B-52D-40-BW Stratofortress, AF Serial No. 56-0687, on display at B-52 Memorial Park, Orlando International Airport, Florida (Ex-McCoy AFB). Photo taken 4 April 2003.

Site information
- Type: Air Force Base

Location
- Location within Florida
- Coordinates: 28°25′46″N 081°18′32″W

Site history
- Built: 1940
- In use: 1940–1975

McCoy AFB (1940–1947, 1951–1975) is a former U.S. Air Force installation located 10 miles (16 km) southeast of Orlando, Florida. It was a training base during World War II. From 1951 to 1975, it was a frontline Strategic Air Command (SAC) base during the Cold War and Vietnam War. It was Orlando's biggest employer and economic backbone prior to the opening of Walt Disney World in 1971.

With McCoy's closure as an active USAF facility in 1975, the site was redeveloped and is known today as Orlando International Airport, which continues to carry the base's original FAA LID airport code of MCO (i.e., McCoy) and ICAO airport code of KMCO.

Over the course of its existence, the installation had several names, including Orlando Army Air Field #2, Pinecastle Army Airfield, and Pinecastle Air Force Base.

== History ==
McCoy Air Force Base was named for Colonel Michael Norman Wright McCoy (1905–1957) on 7 May 1958. Seven months earlier on 9 October 1957, McCoy was killed in the crash of a B-47 Stratojet (DB-47B-35-BW), AF Serial No. 51-2177, of the 447th Bombardment Squadron, 321st Bombardment Wing. The six-engine bomber suffered wing failure northwest of downtown Orlando while taking part in a practice demonstration during the annual SAC Bombing Navigation and Reconnaissance Competition at Pinecastle Air Force Base. McCoy was the aircraft commander during the flight, and the mishap aircraft was one of two at Pinecastle that had been modified to carry the GAM-63 RASCAL air-to-surface missile.

At the time of his death, McCoy was the commander of the 321st Bombardment Wing, the host wing of Pinecastle AFB. A hugely popular figure in Central Florida, he was buried at Arlington National Cemetery in a funeral that included a flyover of multiple B-47s.

=== World War II ===
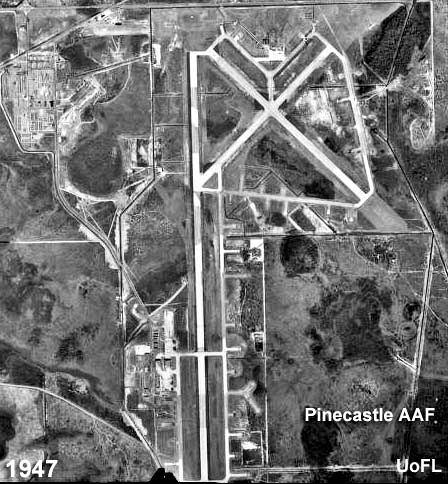
1947 aerial photo of Pinecastle Army Airfield

The facility originally was built in 1940 as a replacement civilian airport after the takeover and conversion of the Orlando Municipal Airport (present-day Orlando Executive Airport) to Orlando Army Air Base by the United States Army Air Corps. However, with the expansion of Orlando AAB following establishment of the Army Air Forces School of Applied Tactics (AAFSAT) in 1942, the new civilian airport was also leased by the now-renamed U.S. Army Air Forces, initially being designated as Orlando Army Air Field #2 and becoming a subbase of Orlando AAB. On 1 January 1943, it was renamed as Pinecastle Army Airfield (AAF).

Pinecastle AAF was aimed to support the training mission of Orlando AAB. Two bomb squadrons of the 9th Bombardment Group at Orlando AAB, the 5th, equipped with B-24 Liberators and the 99th, with North American B-25 Mitchells, Martin B-26 Marauders and Boeing B-17 Flying Fortresses, operated from Pinecastle during the war. The squadrons had the mission of training future combat aircrews for a wide variety of bombing missions in advanced combat techniques.

In addition to the training mission, beginning in 1943, Pinecastle AAF was used as the AAFSAT Technical Center, operating an Air Force General Maintenance and Supply Depot facility. On 1 June 1944, the 901st Army Air Forces Base Unit (Heavy Bombardment), took over the bomber training mission with two squadrons, "G" and "H".

Records indicate that aircraft from Pinecastle AAF performed test bombing of chemical munitions at one of Pinecastle's numerous bombing and gunnery ranges. Whether the chemical warfare materials used in these tests were stored at Pinecastle Army Airfield or transported from the Orlando Toxic Gas and Decontamination Yard at Orlando AAB a few hours before a practice bombing run is uncertain.

With the drawdown and closure of wartime airfields after the German capitulation in May 1945, units from other bases in Florida were consolidated at Pinecastle AAF. On 1 July 1945, jurisdiction of the field was transferred to Air Proving Ground Command at Eglin Field, Florida. The 901st AAFBU was inactivated and replaced by the 621st Base Unit.

=== Postwar years ===
In August 1945, under the Proving Ground Command (PGC), the base was used for testing of the B-32 Dominator bomber, although operations in 1945 at the field were severely curtailed due to personnel shortages caused by postwar demobilization. Weapons tests of the VB-6 Felix infrared heat seeking and VB-3 Razon radio-controlled gliding bombs were also carried out.

Beginning in January 1946, Bell Aircraft Corporation's chief test pilot Jack Woolams tested the X-1 supersonic aircraft, originally designated the XS-1, at the airfield because of the area's then-remote location and 10,000-foot runway.

In March 1946, the X-1 program was relocated to Muroc Army Air Field, California. The move was a logistics issue as much as anything, as Pinecastle was deemed not suitable for the X-1 project. A move to the remote California desert ensured the X-1 project team could maintain secrecy, an important issue considering the project was highly classified at the time. In addition, Muroc had an expansive landing area, due to the surrounding dry lakebeds, and better visibility. The X-1's high sink rate and the problems of keeping the plane in sight amid Florida's frequent clouds also added two more votes in favor of the Army Air Force's decision to go to Muroc.

This aircraft, later flown by then-Captain (Brigadier General, USAF, Retired) Chuck Yeager, would be the first aircraft in history to successfully exceed the speed of sound in level flight. With the X-1 project transferred, Pinecastle AAF was closed and the entire site was transferred to the City of Orlando in 1947 with a reversal clause for future military use if deemed to be necessary for national defense purposes.

=== Cold War ===
==== Air Training Command ====
As a result of the outbreak of the Korean War, the United States Air Force's Air Training Command (ATC) reacquired and reactivated the facility, renaming it Pinecastle Air Force Base on 1 September 1951. ATC immediately began a $100 million military construction program at the World War II facility, to include lengthening the existing north–south runway and constructing a parallel north–south runway, both over 12,000 feet in length. Actual flight training operations, however, did not begin until early 1952.

The 3540th Flying Training Wing (later redesignated the 4240th Flying Training Wing) was activated at the base for the purpose of training personnel in SAC's new Boeing B-47 Stratojet medium jet bomber. Eighty-four B-47s were allocated for the training, and SAC transferred 30 experienced aircraft commanders to Pinecastle to serve as instructors. According to the basic plan, ATC would train 49 crews by the end of 1952. From the beginning, though, mechanical problems with the B-47 and a lack of equipment prevented training. In addition, the base was inadequate at the time in training facilities. The first B-47 class arrived at the base on 6 November 1952, and the first B-47 crew-training program started a few weeks later when Class 53-6A entered combat crew training on 22 December 1952. The first trained B-47 crews graduated from training during the first half of 1953.

On 1 January 1954, ATC transferred both the B-47 crew-training mission at Pinecastle AFB and jurisdiction of the base to the SAC.

==== 321st Bombardment Wing and 19th Bombardment Wing ====
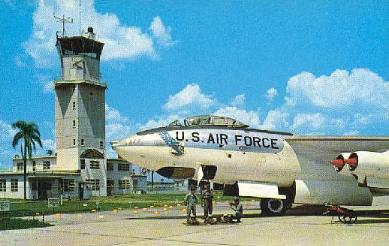
Postcard from Pinecastle AFB in the mid-1950s, showing the Pinecastle AFB control tower and a Boeing B-47E-90-BW Stratojet, AF Ser. No. 52-0477, of the 321st Bomb Wing on the ramp. This B-47 was sent to AMARC in November 1964. The control tower continued to be used by McCoy AFB and as the first control tower for Orlando International Airport.

On 15 December 1953, the 321st Bombardment Wing (Medium) was activated at Pinecastle AFB, absorbing all B-47 bombers and KC-97 tankers at the base. The B-47 combat crew-training mission was also transferred from ATC to SAC. Colonel Michael N.W. McCoy, previously commander of the 306th Bombardment Wing at MacDill Air Force Base, Florida, was appointed commander of the 321st Bombardment Wing on 24 May 1954, having earned the unofficial distinction of being the "dean" of the SAC's B-47 Stratojet aircraft commanders.

In July 1954, the 19th Bombardment Wing joined the 321st at Pinecastle AFB and the two units came under the control of the 813th Strategic Aerospace Division. The 813th was subsequently inactivated in the summer of 1956 when the 19th Bomb Wing moved to Homestead Air Force Base, Florida.

In November 1957, the base was host to the medium and heavy bombers participating in the annual SAC Bombing Navigation and Reconnaissance Competition. During the competition, a B-47 aircraft mishap north of downtown Orlando took the lives of Colonel McCoy, Group Captain John Woodroffe of the Royal Air Force, Lieutenant Colonel Charles Joyce, and Major Vernon Stuff during preparations for the event. Despite this tragedy, the 321st Bomb Wing, under the direction of its new commander, Colonel Robert W. Strong, Jr., won the top honors of the meet, including the coveted Fairchild and McKay trophies, distinguishing the 321st as the top B-47 Wing in SAC.

==== 76th Fighter Interceptor Squadron ====
Another distinguished unit assigned to Pinecastle AFB in November 1957 was the Air Defense Command's 76th Fighter Interceptor Squadron (76 FIS). A descendant of the famous World War II "Flying Tigers", the 76 FIS was commanded by Major Morris F. Wilson and flew the F-89H Scorpion all-weather fighter-interceptor. One of the last squadrons to fly the Scorpion, the 76 FIS was transferred from McCoy to Westover AFB, Massachusetts, on 1 February 1961.

==== McCoy AFB ====
On 7 May 1958, Pinecastle AFB was renamed McCoy Air Force Base in memory of the late Colonel Michael N. W. McCoy. Formal dedication ceremonies were held on 21 May 1958 in conjunction with a mammoth base open house, during which an estimated 30,000 Floridians attended.

In the summer of 1961, a complete reorganization of the base began to convert the base from the B-47 Stratojet medium jet bomber to the Boeing B-52 Stratofortress heavy bomber. As part of this program, the 321st Bomb Wing began phasing out its operations in June 1961 and was inactivated that October.

==== 4047th Strategic Wing ====
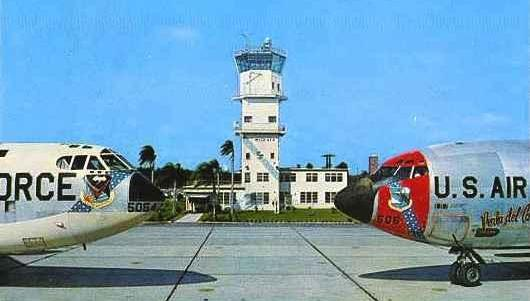
Postcard from McCoy AFB in the early 1960s, showing the McCoy AFB control tower and base operations building, Boeing B-52D-5-BW Stratofortress, AF Ser. No. 55-5054, and Boeing KC-135A-BN Stratotanker, AF Ser. No. 57-1506, of the 4047th Strategic Wing

On 1 July 1961, the 321st was replaced by the 4047th Strategic Wing (Heavy), which was designated and organized under its first commander, Col Francis S. Holmes, Jr. The 4047th was part of SAC's "Strategic Wing" concept, which was to disperse its medium and heavy bombers and tanker aircraft over a larger number of bases, thus making knocking out the entire fleet with a surprise first strike more difficult for the Soviet Union. All of the strategic wings had one squadron of B-52s, containing 15 aircraft, and most also had a squadron of 15 KC-135 tanker aircraft. Half of the bombers and tankers were maintained on 15-minute alert, fully fueled, armed, and ready for combat, while the remainder were used for training in bombardment missions and air-refueling operations.

In August 1961, the first B-52D Stratofortresses were assigned to the new wing, and on 1 September 1961, the 347th Bombardment Squadron was reassigned from Westover AFB, Massachusetts, to McCoy AFB as the wing's operational flying squadron for the heavy bombers. On 15 September, the 321st Combat Support Group was also organized and on that same date, Colonel William G. Walker, Jr., assumed command of the 4047th Strategic Wing.

==== 966th Airborne Early Warning and Control Squadron ====
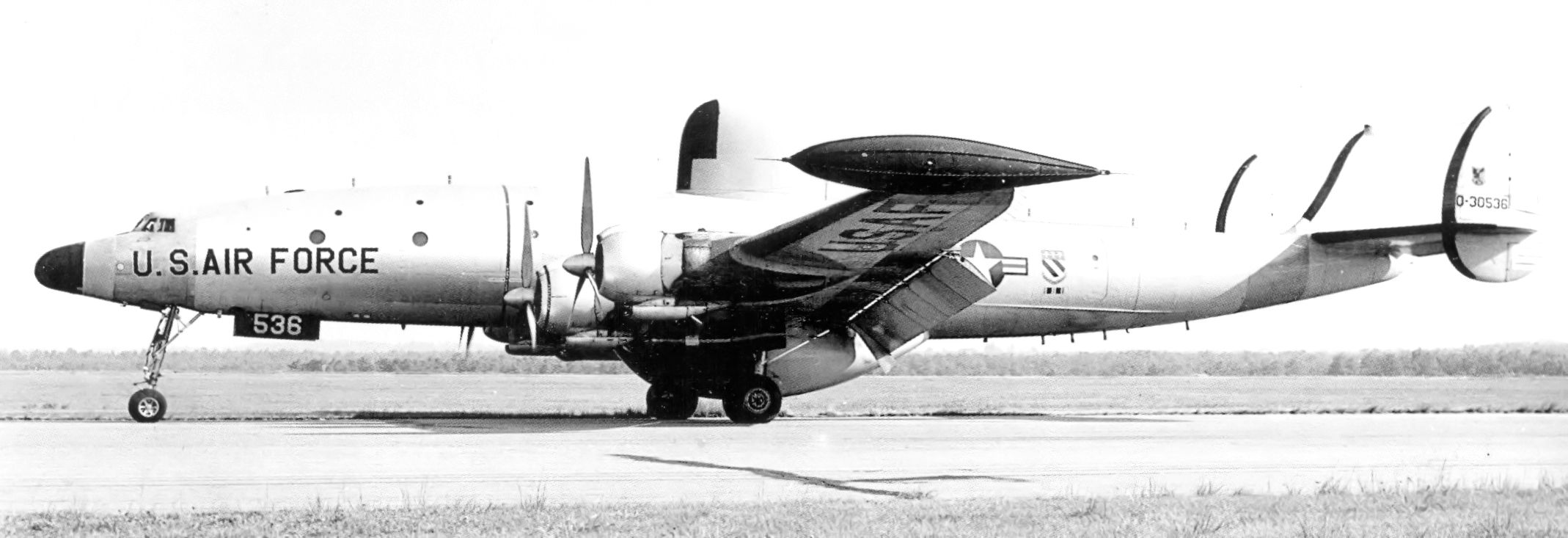
USAF EC-121D Warning Star, AF Ser. No. 53-0536, of the 551st AEW&CW at Otis AFB

The 966th Airborne Early Warning and Control Squadron was activated on 18 December 1961 and was organized two months later at McCoy AFB as a geographically separated unit of the 551st Airborne Early Warning and Control Wing at Otis AFB, Massachusetts. While at McCoy, the squadron flew the propeller-driven EC-121 Warning Star radar-surveillance aircraft in its EC-121D and EC-121Q variants. The squadron changed its parent wing on 1 May 1963, coming under the 552nd Airborne Early Warning and Control Wing, headquartered at McClellan AFB, California. The mission of the 966th Airborne Early Warning and Control Squadron covered a broad spectrum of responsibilities. As an Air Defense Command,(later Aerospace Defense Command) unit, the 966th also supported SAC and Tactical Air Command (TAC) operations, assisted U.S. Navy P-2 Neptune and P-3 Orion aircraft in antisubmarine and maritime surveillance patrols, and developed weather information. It also furnished airborne radar surveillance and technical control in support of global air defense and Joint Chiefs of Staff contingency operations. The 966th aircrews also frequently deployed to distant operational locations, including Southeast Asia. The squadron was inactivated on 31 December 1969, although detachments from other EC-121 squadrons continued to operate at McCoy AFB throughout the early 1970s.

==== Joint Civil-Military Use: McCoy AFB and the Orlando-McCoy Jetport ====
In the early 1960s, the then-Orlando Herndon Airport began to start providing commercial jet service, but its World War II-era 6,000-foot runways were dangerously short to handle the new Boeing 707, Convair 880, and Douglas DC-8 commercial passenger jets. In addition, the air terminal built in 1951 was inadequate to accommodate the increasing number of passengers. McCoy AFB, with its two 12,000-foot runways, was more than capable of safely accommodating the passenger jets.

In 1962, an agreement was worked out between the Air Force and the City of Orlando for the joint use of one of the runways (18L/36R) for airline operations, and the purchase of two former AGM-28 Hound Dog missile storage hangars in the northeast corner of the installation by the city for conversion into a passenger air terminal for use by Delta, Eastern, and National Airlines. The Orlando-McCoy Jetport opened in 1964, with Delta Air Lines being the first airline to offer jet passenger service to the new Orlando-McCoy Jetport with Delta's DC-8 Fanjet aircraft. By 1968, all airline operations had moved from Herndon Airport to the new Orlando-McCoy Jetport.

With the opening of Walt Disney World in 1971, the amount of air traffic increased substantially, especially with Boeing 727, Boeing 737, and Douglas DC-9 aircraft. As a result, the agreement with the Air Force was amended to allow for an expansion of the civilian airport facilities. Additional acreage was provided to Orlando east of the airfield in 1972, and two modern airport terminals were constructed between 1978 and 1981, along with improved parking and other infrastructure. With the improved civilian airport at McCoy, the new wide-body Boeing 747, Douglas DC-10, and Lockheed L-1011 TriStar airliners began scheduled service.

==== Cuban Missile Crisis ====
On 14 October 1962, a Lockheed U-2 from the 4080th Strategic Reconnaissance Wing at Laughlin Air Force Base, Texas, piloted by Major Richard S. Heyser, USAF, launched from Edwards AFB, California, for a high-altitude reconnaissance flight over Cuba. Arriving over the island an hour after sunrise, Heyser photographed the Soviet military installing nuclear armed SS-4 medium-range and SS-5 intermediate-range ballistic missiles in Cuba, thereby precipitating the Cuban Missile Crisis.

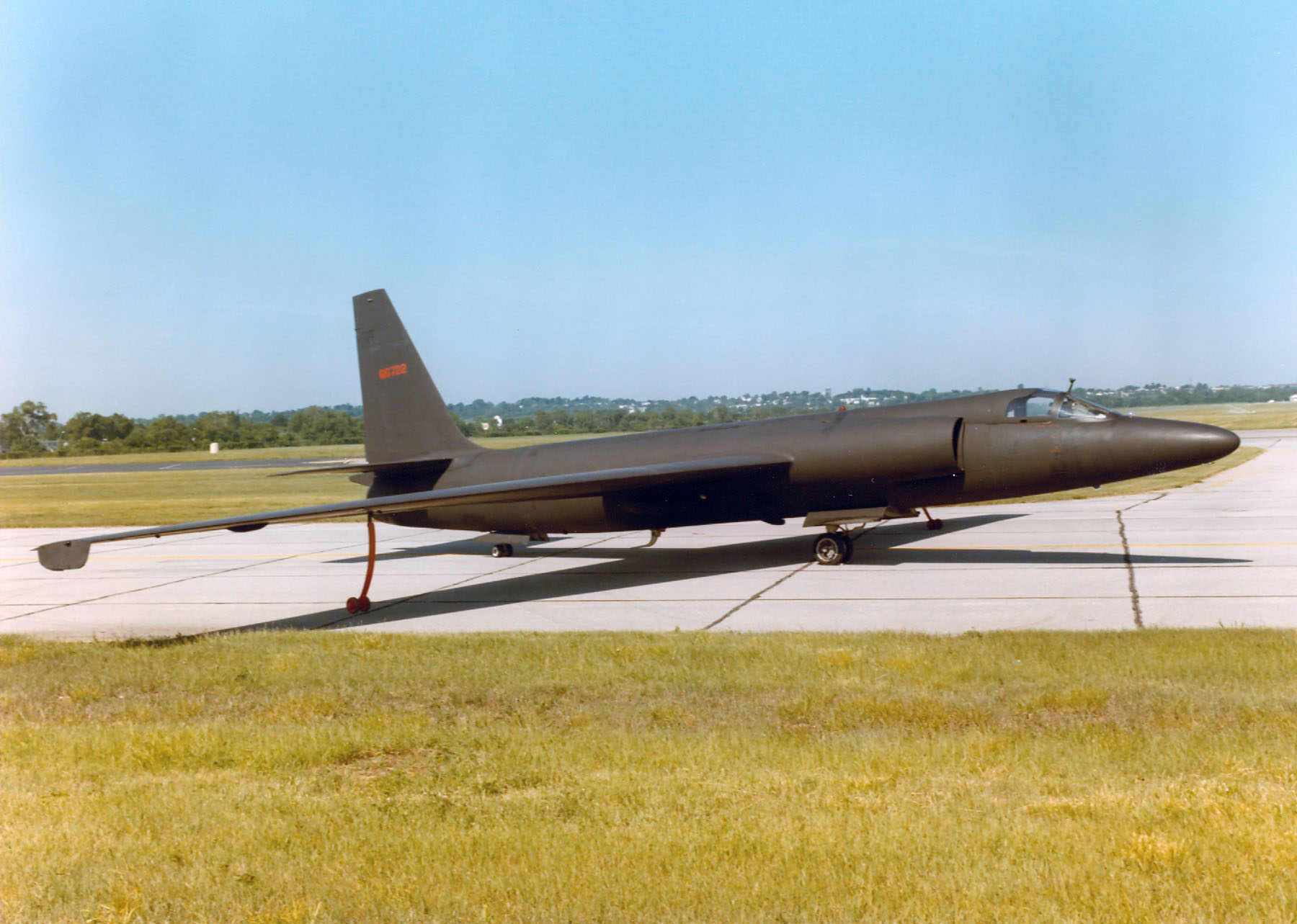
U-2A, similar to U-2Fs operating at McCoy AFB in 1962, in the collection of the National Museum of the U.S. Air Force

Heyser concluded this flight at McCoy AFB and the 4080th subsequently established a U-2 operating location at McCoy AFB, launching and recovering numerous flights over Cuba for the duration of the crisis. On 21 October, Attorney General of the United States Robert F. Kennedy, United States Secretary of Defense Robert McNamara, Chairman of the Joint Chiefs of Staff General Maxwell Taylor, and General Walter C. Sweeney, Jr., USAF, met with President John F. Kennedy concerning a military contingency plan regarding this development. The 4080th's operating location at McCoy AFB, designated OL-X, operated two U-2 aircraft and flew at least 82 missions over Cuba from McCoy AFB from 22 October – 6 December 1962.

General Sweeney, as commander of TAC, proposed an operational plan that first called for an air attack on the surface-to-air missile (SAM) sites in the vicinity of known medium-range (MRBM) and intermediate-range ballistic missile (IRBM) launchers by eight fighter-bombers per SAM site. Concurrently, each of the Cuban MiG airfields thought to be protecting MRBM/IRBM sites was to be struck by at least 12 fighters. Following the air strikes on SAM sites and MiG fighter airfields, each MRBM and IRBM launch site was to be attacked by at least 12 aircraft. General Sweeney's plan was accepted, and Cuban Ilyushin Il-28"Beagl" medium-bomber airfields also were added to the target list.

To support this plan, the USAF deployed the following TAC units to McCoy AFB while simultaneously dispersing the 4047th Strategic Wing's B-52 and KC-135 aircraft:

- 4th Tactical Fighter Wing: 67 F-105Bs
  (Deployed from Seymour Johnson AFB, North Carolina)
- 354th Tactical Fighter Wing: 63 F-100D/Fs
  (Deployed from Myrtle Beach AFB, South Carolina)
- 427th Air Refueling Squadron: 20 KB-50Js
  (Deployed from Langley AFB, Virginia)

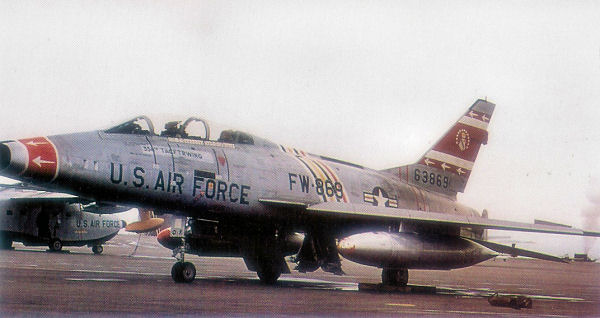
F-100, AF Ser. No. 56-3869, of the 354 TFW at McCoy AFB, October 1962

On the morning of 27 October, a U-2 piloted by Major Rudolf Anderson, Jr., USAF, departed McCoy AFB on yet another Cuban overflight mission. A few hours into his mission, Anderson's aircraft was engaged by a Soviet-manned SA-2 Guideline surface-to-air missile site in the vicinity of Banes, Cuba. Hit by two of three SA-2 missiles fired, the aircraft was shot down over Cuba, killing Major Anderson.

A week following the downing, Major Anderson's remains were turned over to a United Nations representative and returned to the United States. Major Anderson became the first recipient of the Air Force Cross, the USAF's second-highest decoration for valor after the Medal of Honor, which was awarded to him posthumously.

The Cuban missile confrontation was ultimately resolved and the air strikes, which would have been followed by an invasion of Cuba, were never launched. All of the aforementioned squadrons and detachments except one remained at McCoy, though, until the end of November 1962. The 4080th at Laughlin AFB and its successor unit, the 100th Strategic Reconnaissance Wing at Davis-Monthan AFB, Arizona, continued to maintain a permanent operating location at McCoy AFB for U-2 detachment operations monitoring Cuba through 1973, when it relocated to nearby Patrick AFB. In later years, these operations occasionally were augmented by SR-71 detachments from the 9th Strategic Reconnaissance Wing at Beale AFB, California.

==== 306th Bombardment Wing ====
SAC's Strategic Wing concept was phased out in early 1963. In most cases, the aircraft and crews remained at the same base, but the wing and its bomb squadron were given new designations. On 1 April 1963, the 306th Bombardment Wing (306 BW), a B-47 Stratojet unit originally scheduled for inactivation, moved on paper from MacDill AFB, Florida, to McCoy AFB, converting to a B-52D Stratofortress and KC-135A Stratotanker wing by absorbing the assets and personnel of the 4047th Strategic Wing. With this standup of the 306 BW, the 4074th Strategic Wing was inactivated.

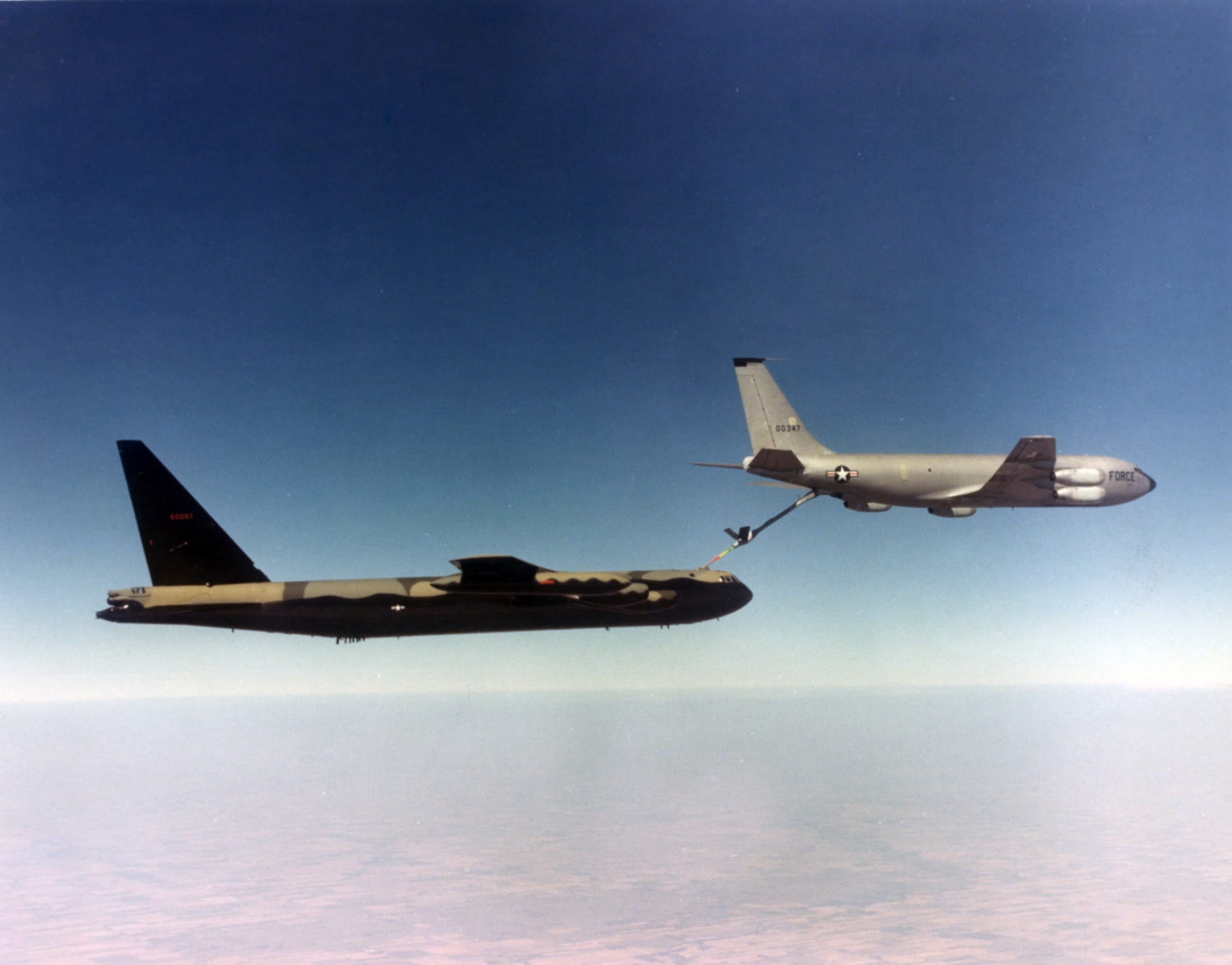
KC-135A AF Ser. No. 60-0347 refuels B-52D AF Ser. No. 55-0057 of the 306 BW: This B-52D is now preserved on display at Maxwell AFB, Alabama

.

In addition to its "host wing" responsibilities for operating and maintaining the installation, the 306th's primary operational mission at McCoy AFB was deterring nuclear attack on the United States by maintaining constant ground alert and flying frequent cycles of airborne alert.

During the 1960s and 1970s, the 306th and McCoy AFB were frequent hosts for the annual SAC Bombing and Navigation Competition' between SAC wings operating B-52, FB-111 and KC-135 aircraft from throughout the Strategic Air Command, competing for the prestigious Fairchild Trophy. Vulcan B.2 bombers and Victor K.2 tankers from the Royal Air Force (RAF) Strike Command would also travel to McCoy AFB from their home bases in the United Kingdom to participate in this multi-week competition.

===== Vietnam War =====
In 1966, the 306 BW began preparing and training for deployment to the Western Pacific in support of Projects Arc Light and Young Tiger. In September 1966, the wing deployed to Andersen AFB, Guam, and Kadena Air Base, Okinawa. Its mission while in the Western Pacific was to "...Conduct bombing raids in support of US and allied ground forces fighting in the Vietnamese War." Later, the wing also operated from U-Tapao Royal Thai Navy Airfield, Thailand as U.S. forces built up in the Vietnam theater. In 1967, the 919th Air Refueling Squadron (919 ARS) also was reassigned to the 306th Bomb Wing.

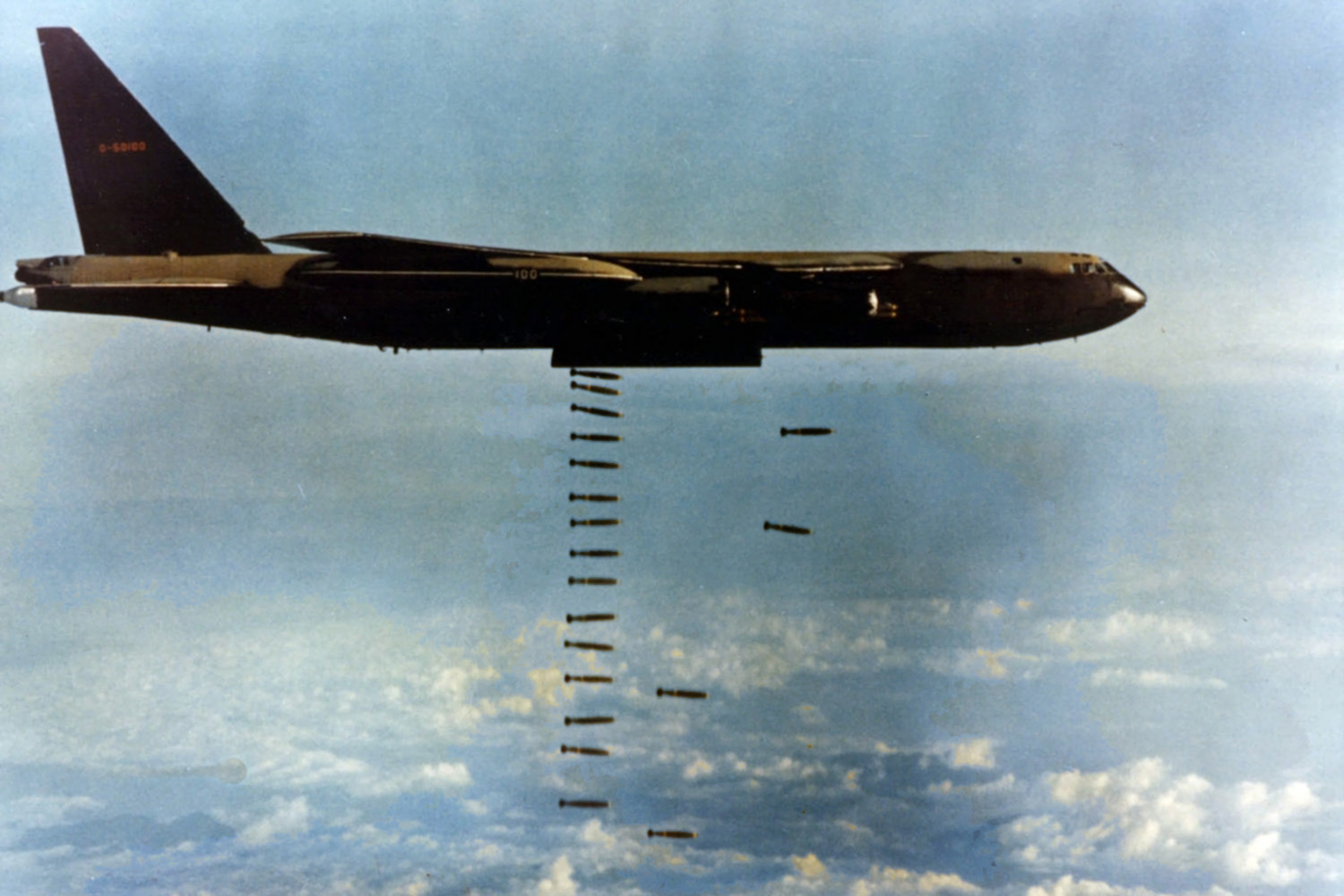
B-52D, AF Ser. No. 55-0100, of McCoy AFB's 306th Bomb Wing while deployed to Southeast Asia: In 1972, it was one of the three final aircraft to bomb North Vietnam during Operation Linebacker II.

When not forward-deployed for operations over Vietnam, the 306th continued to operate out of McCoy AFB for both training evolutions and in its stateside strategic nuclear alert role. In January 1968, the 306 BW received another Air Force Outstanding Unit Award for this "double-duty" for combat operations in Southeast Asia, while maintaining an alert status for SAC.

In 1971, the 919 ARS was inactivated and its personnel and aircraft merged into the 306th Air Refueling Squadron (306 ARS). In 1972, the 306 BW was part of the heavy bombing raids Linebacker I and Linebacker II over North Vietnam. The 306 BW returned to McCoy AFB from its final Southeast Asia deployment in early 1973 after the Paris Peace Accords ended American involvement in the conflict.

From 1971 through 1973, other training activities at McCoy AFB included KC-135Q instruction by the 306 ARS and KC-135A instruction by the 32d Air Refueling Squadron (32 ARS). Whereas KC-135A aircraft typically carried JP-4 jet fuel, KC-135Q aircraft were specifically modified and equipped to offload JP-7 fuel and supported worldwide in-flight refueling requirements for USAF SR-71 reconnaissance aircraft.

==== 55th Aerospace Rescue and Recovery Squadron ====
In February 1970, following the transfer of Kindley AFB, Bermuda to the United States Navy and its redesignation as NAS Bermuda, McCoy AFB briefly became home to the 55th Aerospace Rescue and Recovery Squadron (55 ARRS) and its HC-130 Hercules aircraft. Assigned to Military Airlift Command (MAC) and its subordinate sub-command, the Aerospace Rescue and Recovery Service, the squadron relocated from McCoy AFB to Eglin AFB, Florida, in June 1971.

==== 42nd Air Division ====
In 1971, the 42d Air Division, was transferred from Blytheville Air Force Base, Arkansas, and headquartered at McCoy AFB. In September 1973, with the force reduction-directed closure of McCoy AFB in progress, the air division headquarters was transferred back to Blytheville (later renamed Eaker AFB).

==== B-52 crash at McCoy AFB ====
On 31 March 1972, a 306th Bombardment Wing B-52D, AF Serial Number 56-0625, sustained multiple engine failures and an engine-pod fire shortly after takeoff from McCoy AFB on a routine training mission. Not carrying any weapons, the eight-engine bomber immediately attempted to return to the base, but crashed 3,220 feet (980 m) short of Runway 18R in a civilian residential area immediately north of the airfield, destroying or damaging eight homes. The crew of seven and a 10-year-old boy on the ground were killed. An Orange County historical marker honoring the flight crew was placed adjacent to the crash site in 2012.

=== Major commands to which assigned ===
- Army Air Forces Air Training Command, 1 August 1940
- Army Air Force School of Applied Tactics, 1 October 1943 – 1 July 1945
- Army Air Forces Proving Ground Command, 1 July 1945 – 1947
- Air Training Command, 1 September 1951 – 1 January 1954
- Strategic Air Command, 1 January 1954 – 1975

Air Defense Command / Aerospace Defense Command (Tenant activity; attached 1 March 1957 – 1 February 1961; 1 February 1962 – 31 December 1973)

=== World War II units assigned ===
- 5th Bombardment Squadron, 15 April 1943 – 7 June 1943; 13 February-9 March 1944
- 99th Bombardment Squadron, 31 October 1942 – 5 February 1943; 25 February-9 March 1944

=== Major USAF units assigned ===
- 3540th Flying Training Wing 1 September 1951

Redesignated: 4240th Flying Training Wing, 1 April 1952 – 1 June 1954

- 321st Bombardment Wing, 4 December 1953 – 25 October 1961
- 321st Air Refueling Squadron, 1 April 1952 – 1 August 1956
- 19th Bombardment Wing, 11 June 1954 – 1 June 1956
- 813th Strategic Aerospace Division, 15 July 1954 – 1 June 1956
- 76th Fighter-Interceptor Squadron (ADC), 8 November 1957 – 1 February 1961
- 4047th Strategic Wing, 1 September 1961 – 1 April 1963

Replaced by: 306th Bombardment Wing, 1 April 1963 – 1 July 1974

- 306th Air Refueling Squadron, 1 April 1963 – 30 September 1973 (Not operational 1–30 September 1973)
- 919th Air Refueling Squadron, 25 March 1967 – 30 June 1971 (Not operational 15–30 June 1971)
- 966th Airborne Air Control Squadron, 18 December 1961 – 31 December 1973

Deployed from: 551st Airborne Early Warning and Control Wing, Otis AFB, Massachusetts

- 42d Air Division, 30 June 1971 – 1 September 1973
- Units Deployed to McCoy during Cuban Missile Crisis:

From 4th Tactical Fighter Wing, Seymour Johnson AFB, North Carolina (TAC), 21 October – 29 November 1962

334th Tactical Fighter Squadron
335th Tactical Fighter Squadron
336th Tactical Fighter Squadron

From 354th Tactical Fighter Wing, Myrtle Beach AFB, South Carolina (TAC), 21 October – 1 December 1962

355th Tactical Fighter Squadron
356th Tactical Fighter Squadron

From 4505th Air Refueling Wing, Langley AFB, Virginia (TAC), 21 October – 1 December 1962

427th Air Refueling Squadron (Deployed From Robins AFB, Georgia)

Detachment, 4080th Strategic Reconnaissance Wing

Operating Location XX (OL-XX), October 1962 – February 1966

Detachment, 100th Strategic Reconnaissance Wing

Operating Location LF (OL-LF), February 1966 – o/a June 1974

=== Realignment and closure ===
In April 1973, following the cease-fire agreement with North Vietnam, the return of all American prisoners of war, and anticipated reduced defense budgets, the Secretary of Defense (SECDEF) announced the closure of more than 40 bases as part of a post-Vietnam reduction in force (RIF).

Included were the major SAC installations of Ramey AFB, Puerto Rico; Westover AFB, Massachusetts; Kincheloe AFB, Michigan; and McCoy AFB, Florida. In making this announcement, SECDEF Elliot Richardson noted that Ramey was on the Caribbean island of Puerto Rico and Westover and McCoy near the east coast of the United States and therefore, as a rationale for their closure, were "...subject to short warning time attacks by (Soviet) submarine-launched ballistic missiles." Richardson's decision was consistent with earlier SAC guidance, issued in 1954, to avoid basing strategic bomber forces within 250 miles of the Atlantic or Gulf Coasts, although this guidance had never been implemented.

However, the 250-mile rationale had been partially employed (in addition to other factors, ranging from the retirement of SAC B-47s in the early 1960s to the costs of maintaining SAC B-52 units in Southeast Asia in support of the Vietnam War in the late 1960s) in the earlier transitioning of MacDill AFB and Homestead AFB in Florida from SAC bomber/tanker bases to TAC fighter bases, the removal of a tenant SAC bomb wing at Eglin AFB, Florida, to also be replaced by a TAC fighter wing, the turnover of Turner Air Force Base, Georgia, to the United States Navy and its redesignation as Naval Air Station Albany, and the turnover of Hunter Air Force Base, Georgia, to the U.S. Army and its redesignation as Hunter Army Airfield.

Westover AFB would transition to Westover Air Reserve Base, an airlift installation under Air Force Reserve control, initially for C-123 Provider and C-130 Hercules aircraft, and eventually for C-5 Galaxy aircraft. Ramey AFB, Kincheloe AFB, and McCoy AFB were destined for civilian airport status, although Ramey would become home to Coast Guard Air Station Borinquen with HH-3F Pelican and continuing today with HH-65C Dolphin helicopters and as a periodic operating location for USAF KC-135 Stratotanker aircraft.

With the announcement of McCoy AFB's closure, USAF also announced that the 306th Bombardment Wing also would be inactivated. The 306th Bombardment Wing (Heavy) inactivated in July 1974 as activities at the base were phased down prior to the closure, while its personnel, along with its B-52D and KC-135A aircraft assets, were redistributed to other SAC bomb wings. However, this inactivation was short-lived, when the 306th was reactivated in 1975 as the 306th Strategic Wing at RAF Mildenhall, United Kingdom, coordinating SAC KC-135 assets in support of U.S. Air Forces in Europe until it was replaced by the 100th Air Refueling Wing in 1992. Today, it operates as the 306th Flying Training Group, an Air Education and Training Command unit at the U.S. Air Force Academy and Pueblo Memorial Airport as a geographically separated unit of the 12th Flying Training Wing at Randolph Air Force Base, Texas.

EC-121 and U-2 detachment operations at McCoy AFB were also relocated in 1973 and 1974, with ADC's EC-121 aircraft moving 210 miles south to Homestead AFB and the 100th Strategic Reconnaissance Wing's Lockheed U-2 detachment and associated aircraft Operating Location moving 45 miles east-southeast to Patrick AFB.

Final closure of McCoy AFB was concluded in early 1975. Those portions of McCoy AFB that were not slated for transfer to other U.S. government activities (primarily the U.S. Navy and U.S. Army) were transferred to the General Services Administration, which subsequently transferred title of the remaining McCoy AFB property, to include the airfield, to the City of Orlando for the sum of $1.00, a standard amount at the time for the transfer of former military air bases to state and local governments. This transfer also contained a reversal clause, another standard practice at the time, enabling the USAF to return to McCoy in the future if national security requirements ever dictated same.

The Greater Orlando Aviation Authority (GOAA) was established the following year as a successor to the City of Orlando Aviation Department via an act of the Florida State Legislature. GOAA was charged to operate and maintain both the former McCoy AFB and Herndon Airport, the latter subsequently renamed Orlando Executive Airport. The large hangars and myriad of aircraft maintenance support buildings at McCoy were eventually transferred to other U.S. government agencies or leased by GOAA to private interests, and today, many of them remain supporting the civilian aviation community. The combined former McCoy AFB and extant Orlando-McCoy Jetport were renamed as the Orlando International Airport, and greatly expanded to support the growing tourist industry in Orlando, as well as the expanding business and commercial expansion of the area. Today Orlando International Airport is among the busiest commercial airports in the world as measured by annual passenger throughput. Over thirty airlines serve the airport with hundreds of daily flights to destinations across the United States and overseas. Orlando International Airport still retains the ICAO code of KMCO' and the FAA and IATA code MCO, a legacy of both the Orlando-McCoy Jetport and McCoy AFB.

== Current uses ==
Today, most of the McCoy AFB site is operated and maintained by the Greater Orlando Aviation Authority (GOAA) as Orlando International Airport. As a governmental entity chartered by the Florida Legislature and as an enterprise fund of the City of Orlando, GOAA is tasked with the operation, administration, maintenance, and oversight of expansions and enhancements to both Orlando International Airport and the Orlando Executive Airport. GOAA also leases buildings and property to private individuals and companies, primarily for aviation-related activities in support of the respective airports. Redeveloped areas on the former McCoy AFB / current Orlando International Airport include:

- The current 1,000-acre (4.0 km^{2}) site for the Orlando International Airport landside and airside terminal complexes and associated support areas
- Two International Arrivals Concourses with customs, immigration, and agricultural inspection facilities administered by the U.S. Customs and Border Protection (CBP). Of the total 114 airport gates, the Greater Orlando Aviation Authority manages 11 gates with seven additional gates available for international operations. Expansive fixed-base operator, domestic, and charter flight operations facilities are also located on airport property.
- The Orlando Tradeport', a 1,400-acre (5.7 km^{2}) master-planned integrated cargo center with direct airside access, 140 acres (0.57 km^{2}) of cargo ramp, a 205-acre (0.83 km^{2}) Foreign Trade Zone, and an ultramodern Plant Inspection Station with several perishable handling facilities: Originally a United States Department of Agriculture (USDA) facility, the station was transferred to the CBP in 2003. Concurrently, many of the former USAF hangars and maintenance facilities have been taken over by civilian airlines and other aeronautical and aviation firms.

Tributes to Colonel McCoy and McCoy AFB at and near the airport include:

- The airport's ICAO, FAA, and IATA airfield identifiers, as well as all airline tickets and baggage tags, continue to read "MCO", which stands for McCoy. The FAA also has an established standard instrument departure for aircraft departing MCO known as the MCCOY ONE departure.
- A portrait of Colonel McCoy hangs in the airport's main landside terminal near the airport chapel.
- One of the restaurants in the airport's Hyatt Hotel is named McCoy's.
- The Orange County Public School System operates the Colonel Michael McCoy Elementary School, which is located just north of the airport, while a nearby thoroughfare is called McCoy Road.
- McCoy AFB's original military credit union continues to operate throughout Central Florida as the McCoy Federal Credit Union.

Over the past 30 years, most of the former McCoy AFB has been subjected to extensive modification due to the addition of new structures, taxiways, or runways. In addition, the remaining lands have been subjected to extensive excavation, landfill, and improvement activities. Although several former military structures remain and a new joint military reserve facility was added, a significant portion of the former air force base is barely recognizable.

A continuing impact of both the former Pinecastle AAF, Pinecastle AFB, McCoy Air Force Base, and the former Orlando AAB is the continued excavation of unspent ammunition, including small practice bombs, aerial rockets, and machine-gun rounds from the World War II era in the areas northeast of the current Orlando International Airport and east and southeast of the current Orlando Executive Airport. These formerly remote and uninhabited areas were leased from local landowners at the time and used as bombing and gunnery ranges for Orlando AAB and Pinecastle AAF when both were Army Air Forces facilities during World War II. At the conclusion of the war, they were returned to the original owners and their previous primarily agricultural purposes. With Central Florida's increasing population from the 1980s to the early 21st century, these landowners and/or their descendants sold these properties for private redevelopment, predominantly residential housing and associated support infrastructure such as schools, parks, and retail, often with limited or no knowledge of these properties' previous wartime uses. In recent years, new discoveries of unspent conventional munitions have caused repeated closures of Odyssey Middle School, northeast of Orlando International Airport.

=== Post-closure military presence ===
Until 1980, SAC considered retaining its former alert facility on the south end of the airfield as either an operating location or as a smaller installation to be called McCoy Air Force Station under control of an air base squadron for occasional dispersal basing of two B-52D/G/H and two KC-135A/E/Q aircraft from other SAC installations. This concept never came to fruition, but the alert facility, a nose dock hangar, and several buildings on the north end of the McCoy ramp were turned over to the United States Army Reserve for use as the 49th Army Aviation Support Facility for its units, specifically the 138th Aviation Company (EW), which operated RU-8D, JU-21A, RU-21A, RU-21B, and RU-21C aircraft until replaced by C-12 Huron and RC-12G electronic reconnaissance aircraft, plus the 348th Medical Detachment with UH-1 medical evacuation helicopters. This arrangement permitted USAF access to the remaining military facilities at MCO if and when it became necessary. The Army Reserve aviation units were inactivated in 1999 pursuant to an earlier Base Realignment and Closure Commission decision, but most of the alert facility still remains under Army Reserve control as a non-flying military facility.

A significant portion of the McCoy AFB base facilities was transferred to the Navy between 1974 and 1975, primarily base housing, base exchange, commissary, medical clinic, base chapel, and morale, welfare, and recreation facilities, becoming the Naval Training Center Orlando McCoy Annex'. From 1975 to 1999, the annex supported various tenant command activities that included the Army Reserve aviation units, other units of the U.S. Navy and the U.S. Naval Reserve, U.S. Army Reserve, Florida Army National Guard, and the U.S. Air Force Liaison Office of the Florida Wing of the Civil Air Patrol. Administrative support and housing area for both McCoy Annex activities and primary command and tenant command activities at the nearby Naval Training Center Orlando were also maintained.

In 1984, a B-52D Stratofortress, AF Serial No. 56-0687, on loan from the National Museum of the United States Air Force, was flown to Orlando International Airport from the 7th Bomb Wing at the then-Carswell AFB, Texas, for permanent static display at the airport's McCoy AFB/B-52 Memorial Park. It is located north-northwest of the current civilian commercial terminal and just east of and adjacent to the former location of the since-dismantled Orlando-McCoy Jetport civilian terminal.

McCoy Annex operated until Naval Training Center Orlando's closure in late 1999 pursuant to a 1993 BRAC decision. The former military family housing area originally constructed by the Air Force and later used by the Navy and other military service branches was fully turned over to the City of Orlando in late 1999 and was redeveloped into the Villages at Southport'. Housing sales began in 1996, and the complex was awarded a US Department of Housing and Urban Development award for outstanding development.

With the closure of NTC Orlando in late 1999, the only military activities remaining at the former McCoy AFB today are units of the reserve components of the United States Armed Forces.

The 1LT David R. Wilson Armed Forces Reserve Center hosts the Army Reserve 143rd Sustainment Command (Expeditionary), 912th Human Resources Company, 196th Transportation Company, 146th Transportation Detachment, 520th Transportation Detachment/3rd Team, 174th Judge Advocate General Detachment/10th Team, 174th Judge Advocate General Detachment/11th Team, 174th Judge Advocate General Detachment, the Navy Reserve Operational Support Center Orlando and the United States Marine Corps Reserve Motor Transportation Company, Combat Logistics Battalion 451.

The Taft United States Army Reserve Center is located at 9500 Armed Forces Reserve Drive and includes the 689th Engineer Company and 418th Military Police Detachment.

The McCoy United States Army Reserve Center is home to the 377th Military Intelligence Battalion, which uses McCoy AFB's former SAC bomber and tanker flight crew alert facility (e.g., "mole hole").

The Orlando Armory of the Florida Army National Guard is located within the grounds of the former McCoy AFB, having converted the former McCoy AFB Officers Club into the 164th Air Defense Artillery Brigade Headquarters.

The Navy Exchange (to include an NEX MaxiMart grocery facility in lieu of a Defense Commissary Agency commissary) continued operations at the former McCoy AFB. The Navy Exchange facility has barber, optical, and tailor shops, a Subway restaurant, and a Morale, Welfare and Recreation Information, Tours, and Tickets office. This is due to the continued presence of Naval Air Warfare Center and Naval Support Activity Orlando, a large National Guard and Reserve Component presence, and the military retiree population in the Orlando/Central Florida area that makes the facility financially self-sustaining.

== See also ==
- Florida World War II Army Airfields
- Army Air Force School of Applied Tactics
