= 813th Strategic Aerospace Division =

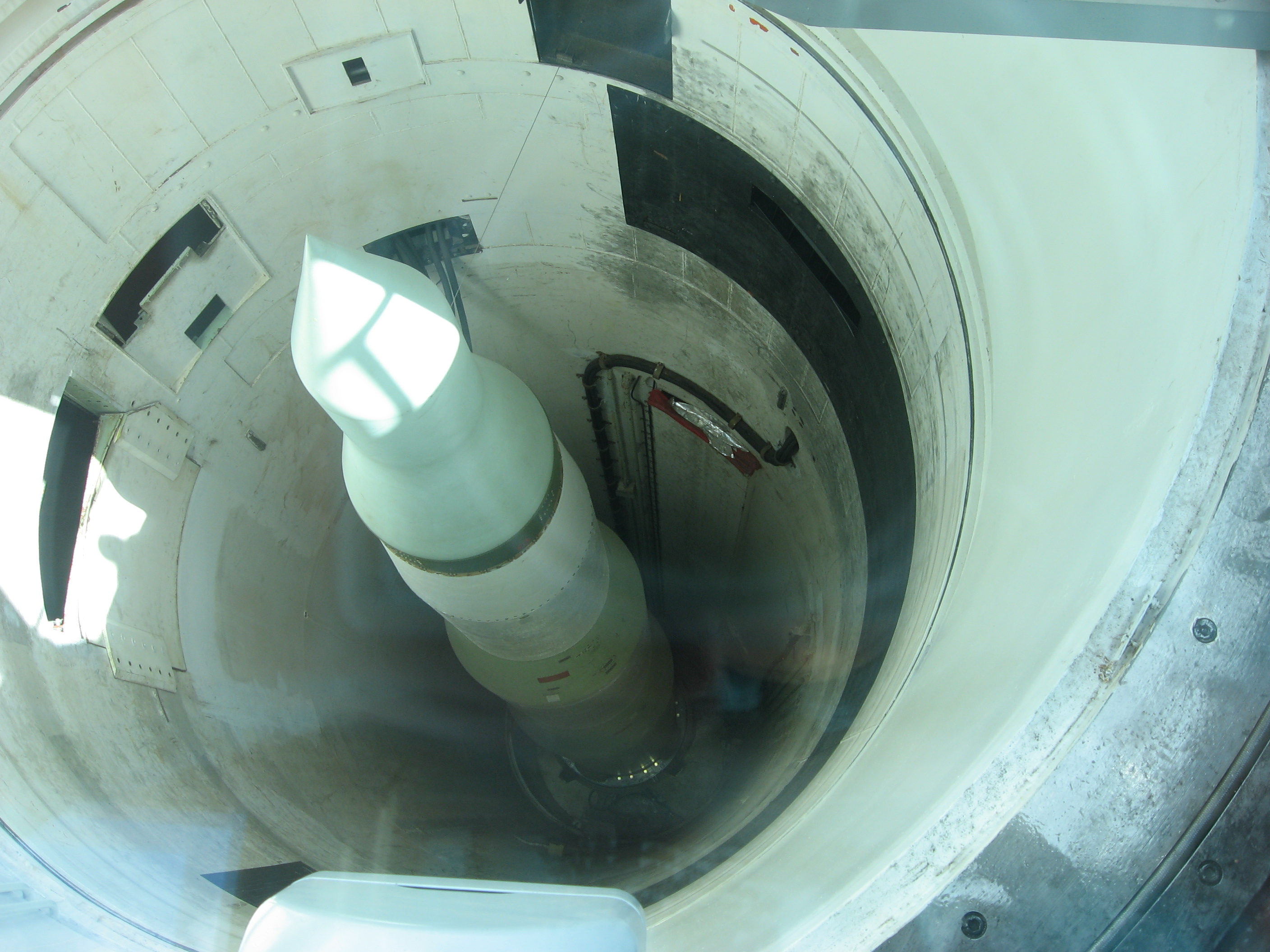
- LGM-30A Minuteman I in its silo
- Active: 1954–1956; 1959–1966
- Country: United States
- Branch: United States Air Force
- Role: Command of Strategic strike forces

Commanders
- Notable commanders: Lt General Keith K. Compton

Insignia
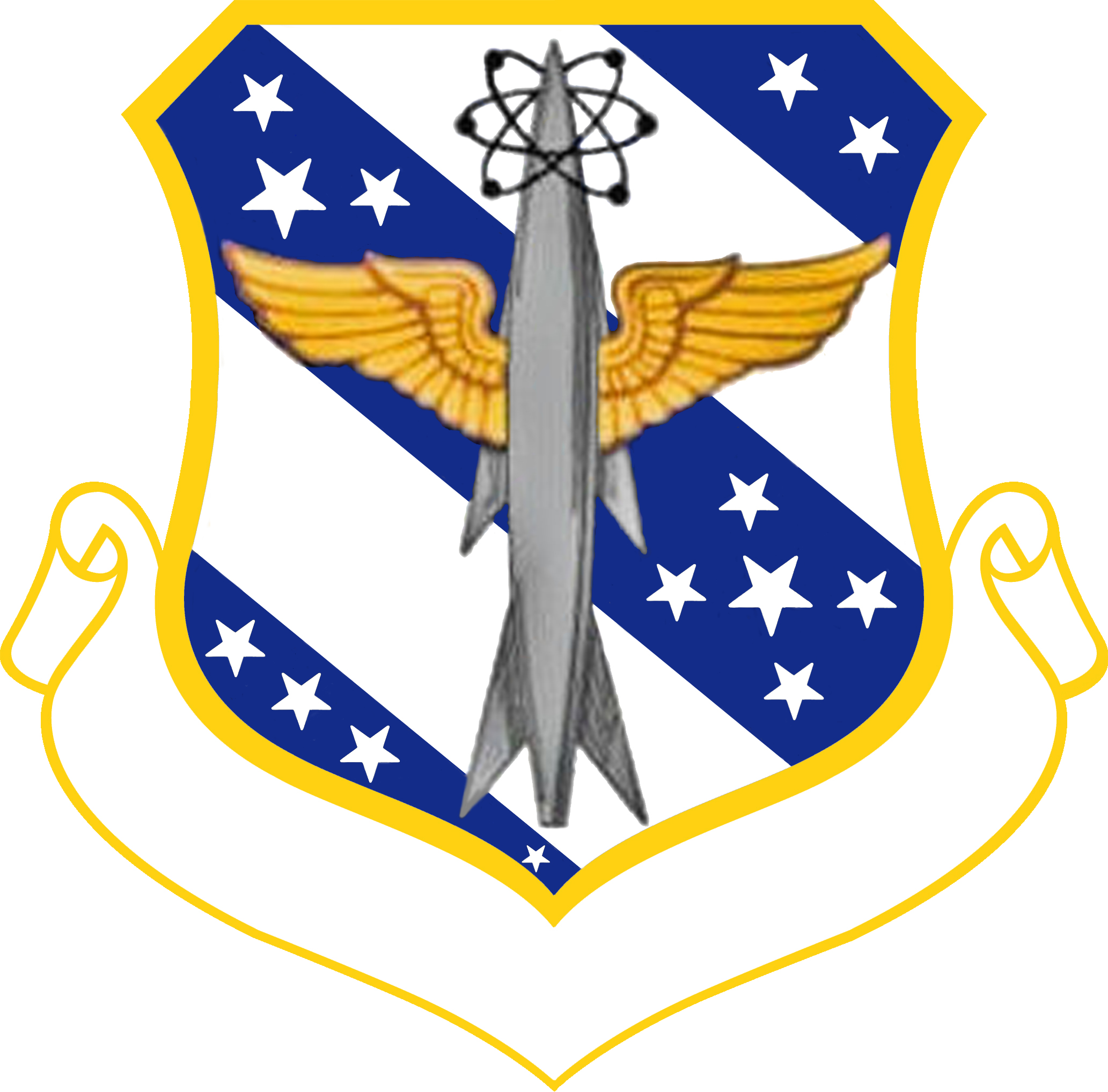
- 813th Strategic Aerospace Division emblem (Note: Approved 19 April 1965. Description: bendy of five pieces azure and argent, the first, third and fifth stripes spattered with mullets of the last [color mentioned] overall in pale a missile gray fimbriated dark gray winged or garnished brown its nose enveloped by an atomic symbol azure, all within a diminished bordure gold.)

The 813th Strategic Aerospace Division is an inactive United States Air Force organization. Its last assignment was with Fifteenth Air Force at Malmstrom Air Force Base, Montana, where it was inactivated on 2 July 1966.

The division was activated in 1954 as the 813th Air Division at Pinecastle Air Force Base, Florida as the headquarters for the base and its two Boeing B-47 Stratojet wings. It was inactivated two years later when the 19th Bombardment Wing moved to Homestead Air Force Base, Florida, leaving only the 321st Bombardment Wing at Pinecastle.

The division was again activated in 1958 at Mountain Home Air Force Base, Idaho as an operational headquarters for Strategic Air Command (SAC) wings at Mountain Home and Malmstrom. It was also responsible for SAC units at forward deployment bases in Canada. The wing moved to Malmstrom in 1964 and was inactivated when its component wings were assigned to other divisions.

== History ==
=== Pinecastle Air Force Base ===
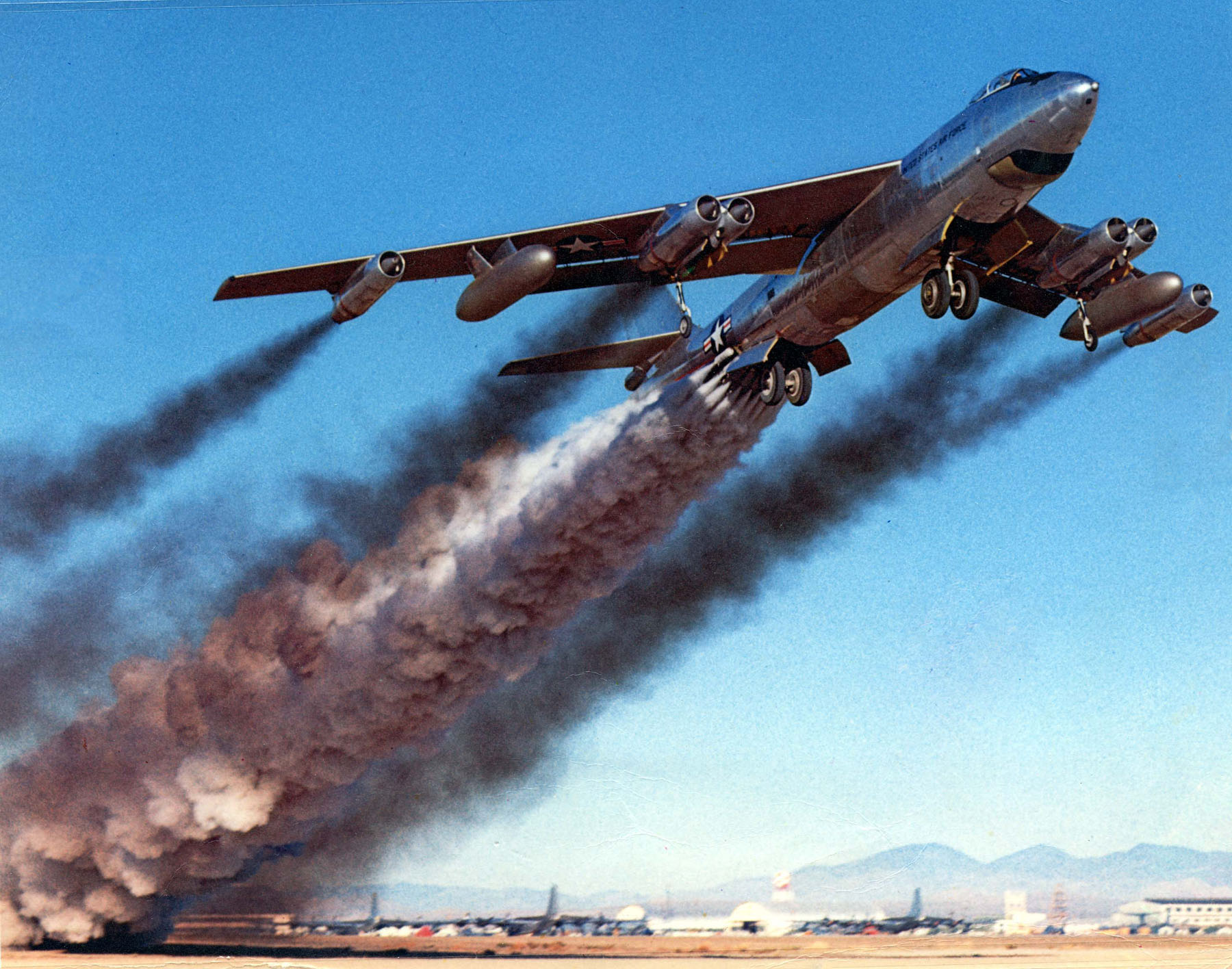
Boeing B-47 rocket-assisted take off

In June 1954, Strategic Air Command (SAC) discontinued its 4240th Flying Training Wing at Pinecastle Air Force Base, Florida and training on the Boeing B-47 Stratojet was concentrated with Air Training Command (ATC)'s 3520th Combat Crew Training Wing at McConnell Air Force Base, Kansas. (Note: The 3520th Flying Training Wing was redesignated as a Combat Crew Training Wing in September 1954.) This completed the transition of Pinecastle from ATC to SAC that had begun at the end of 1953 when SAC activated its 321st Bombardment Wing at Pinecastle as a B-47 bombardment wing.

On 11 June 1954, SAC organized the Air Division, Provisional, 813th at Pinecastle along with the arrival of the 19th Bombardment Wing, which was transferred from Far East Air Forces to equip with B-47s at Pinecastle. Four days later the 813th Air Division was activated to replace the provisional unit and assume operational command of the two wings. It also assumed base support functions through its 813th Air Base Group, which was manned from the inactivating 321st Air Base Group.

Once the division's two wings were combat ready, they periodically deployed to Morocco and the United Kingdom. Although each of the division's wings had air refueling squadrons, flying Boeing KC-97 Stratofreighters, attached or assigned, both the 19th and 321st Air Refueling Squadrons were located at other bases.

The Air Force reopened Homestead Air Force Base in 1955, and the 4226th Air Base Squadron was organized there and attached to the division. In November the 379th Bombardment Wing was activated at Homestead and replaced the squadron. The 379th spent the next several months becoming organized and manned, but did not receive any tactical aircraft until April 1956. On 1 June 1956 the 19th wing moved to join the 379th at Homestead, and both wings were reassigned to the 823d Air Division there. This left only a single wing at Pinecastle, so there was no longer a need for a division level organization there. The 813th was inactivated and the 321st wing was reassigned directly to Second Air Force, while the personnel and equipment of the 813th Air Base Group were transferred to the wing's 321st Air Base Group.

=== Mountain Home and Malmstrom Air Force Bases ===
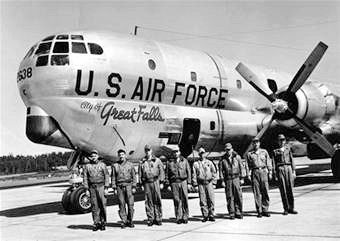
97th Air Refueling Squadron KC-97 (Note: Aircraft is Boeing KC-97G-21-BO Stratofreighter, serial 52-838, City of Great Falls. This plane was later converted to a KC-97L with the addition of two J47 jet engines. Baugher, Joe (15 July 2023). "1952 USAF Serial Numbers". Joe Baugher.)

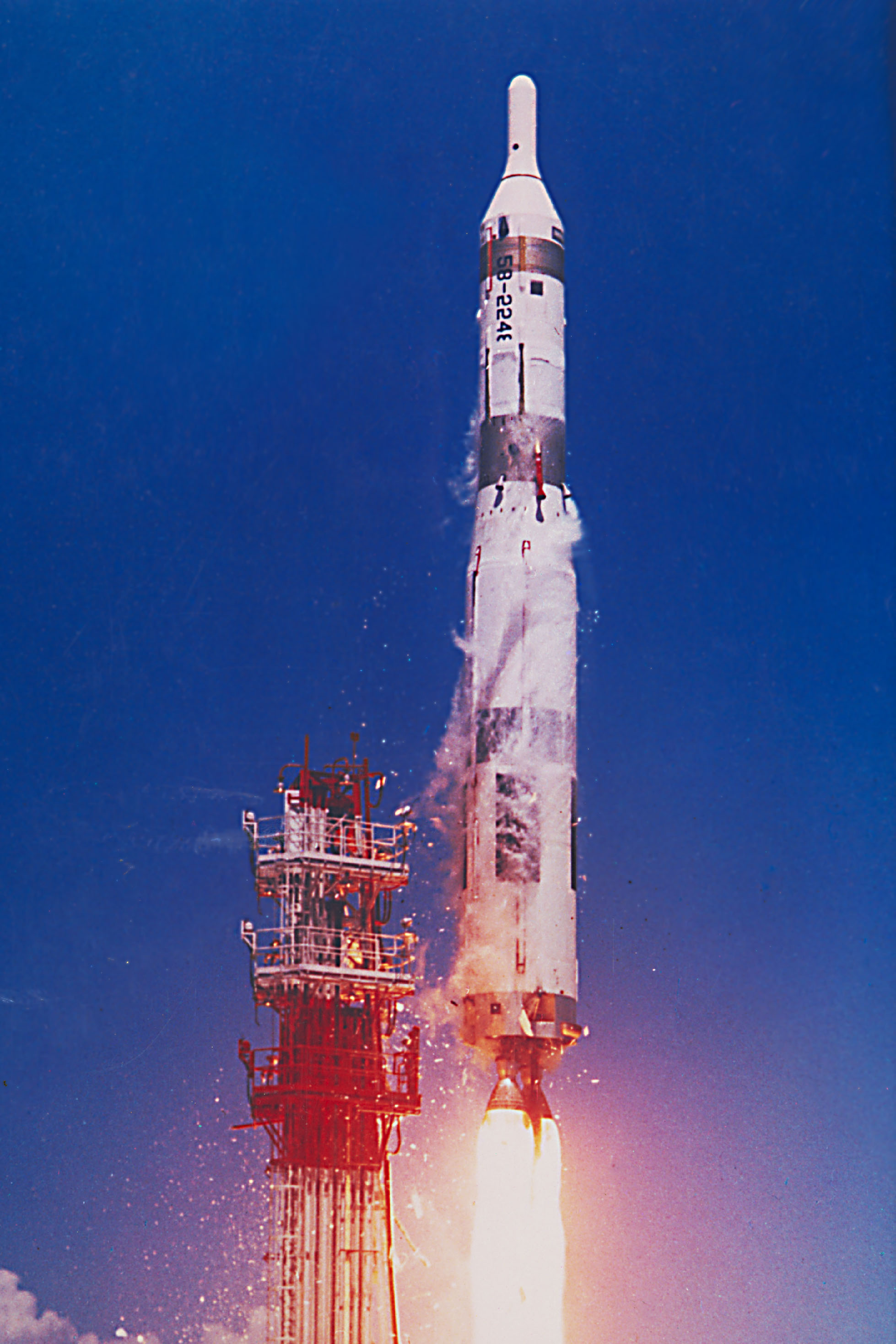
Titan 1 ICBM

The division was reactivated at Mountain Home Air Force Base, Idaho in 1959 as an operational headquarters for the B-47 bomber wing at Mountain Home and the 4061st Air Refueling Wing, which flew KC-97s from Malmstrom Air Force Base, Montana. The division also assumed responsibility for SAC base units located at bases in Canada where tankers were forward deployed.

In June 1961, the division's 9th Bombardment Wing added an HGM-25A Titan I squadron, and the division maintained the capability to conduct long range bombardment operations and launch intercontinental ballistic missiles. The following month, the 4061st wing was discontinued and its 97th Air Refueling Squadron reassigned to the 9th wing, while remaining at Malmstrom.

In the spring of 1962 SAC units with responsibility for both bomber and missile forces were redesignated to include the term aerospace in their designations. The 813th became the 813th Strategic Aerospace Division, while its 9th wing became the 9th Strategic Aerospace Wing. In July 1962, the 4364th Support Squadron was activated at Mountain Home and assigned to the division, but attached to the 9th wing. The squadron was one of four EB-47 airborne radio relay squadrons activated by SAC to provide communications with SAC elements during a strike against the United States as an airborne counterpart to its underground command posts. The 4364th was inactivated a little less than three years later in March 1965, when the Post-Attack Command and Control System was transferred to air refueling units flying Boeing EC-135Cs and located at bases with the command posts.

In July 1964 the 813th moved to Malmstrom, where the 341st Strategic Missile Wing, equipped with LGM-30A Minuteman I missiles was assigned to it. The division also supported Air Force Reserve and Air National Guard programs, and safety and security protection programs. The division was inactivated at Malmstrom in 1966,

== Lineage ==
- Constituted as 813 Air Division on 28 May 1954

Activated on 15 July 1954
Inactivated on 1 June 1956

- Activated on 15 July 1959

Redesignated 813 Strategic Aerospace Division on 1 April 1962
Discontinued and inactivated on 2 July 1966

=== Assignments ===
- Second Air Force, 15 July 1954 – 1 June 1956
- Fifteenth Air Force, 15 July 1959 – 2 July 1966

=== Stations ===
- Pinecastle Air Force Base, Florida, 15 July 1954 – 1 June 1956
- Mountain Home Air Force Base, Idaho, 15 July 1959
- Malmstrom Air Force Base, Montana, 1 July 1964 – 2 July 1966

=== Components ===
Wings

- 9th Bombardment Wing (later, 9 Strategic Aerospace Wing): 15 July 1959 – 25 June 1966
- 19th Bombardment Wing: 15 July 1954 – 1 June 1956 (attached to 5th Air Division 7 January 1956 – 11 April 1956)
- 321st Bombardment Wing: 15 July 1954 – 1 June 1956 (attached to 7th Air Division 9 December 1954 – 5 March 1955; 5th Air Division, 9 April 1956 – 1 June 1956)
- 341st Strategic Missile Wing: 1 July 1964 – 2 July 1966
- 379th Bombardment Wing: Attached 1 November 1955 – 31 May 1956

Homestead Air Force Base, Florida

- 4061st Air Refueling Wing: 15 July 1959 – 15 July 1961

Groups

- 813th Air Base Group: 15 June 1954 – 1 June 1956

Squadrons

- 3949th Air Base Squadron:

Fort Churchill, Manitoba, Canada, c. 1 August 1962 – 15 August 1963

- 3950th Air Base Squadron:

RCAF Station Cold Lake, Alberta, Canada, c. 31 March 1960 – 15 November 1963

- 3955th Air Base Squadron:
- 3960 Air Base Squadron: c. 1 March 1960 – c. 1 November 1960

RCAF Station Namao, Alberta, Canada

- 4226th Air Base Squadron: Attached 8 February 1955 – 1 November 1955

Homestead Air Force Base, Florida

- 4364th Support Squadron (Airborne Radio Relay), (later 4364th Post Attack Command Control Squadron): 20 July 1962 - 25 March 1965 (attached to 9th Strategic Aerospace Wing)

Other

- 4240th USAF Dispensary: 15 June 1954 – 1 June 1956

=== Aircraft and Missiles ===
- Boeing B-47 Stratojet, 1954–1956; 1959–1966
- Boeing EB-47 Stratojet, 1962–1965
- Boeing KC-97 Stratofreighter, 1954–1956; 1959–1965
- HGM-25A Titan I, 1962–1965
- LGM-30A Minuteman I, 1964–1966

=== Commanders ===
- Col Michael N. W. McCoy, 15 July 1954 (Note: Colonel McCoy was killed in the crash of a B-47 while commanding the 321st Bombardment Wing in 1957. Pinecastle was renamed McCoy Air Force Base in his honor. "Behind the Legend of Col Mike McCoy". Orlando Sentinel. 7 October 2007. Archived from the original on 23 May 2011..)
- Brig Gen Keith K. Compton, 26 July 1954 – 1 June 1956
- Col Robert V. De Shazo, 25 July 1959
- Col Berton H. Burns, 26 June 1961
- Brig Gen Lawrence S. Lightner, 1 July 1964
- Col Gerald G. Robinson, 16 July 1965 – 2 July 1966

== See also ==
- List of United States Air Force air divisions
- List of MAJCOM wings of the United States Air Force
- List of USAF Bomb Wings and Wings assigned to Strategic Air Command
- List of missile wings of the United States Air Force
- List of B-47 units of the United States Air Force
