= 19th Airlift Wing =

19th Airlift Wing

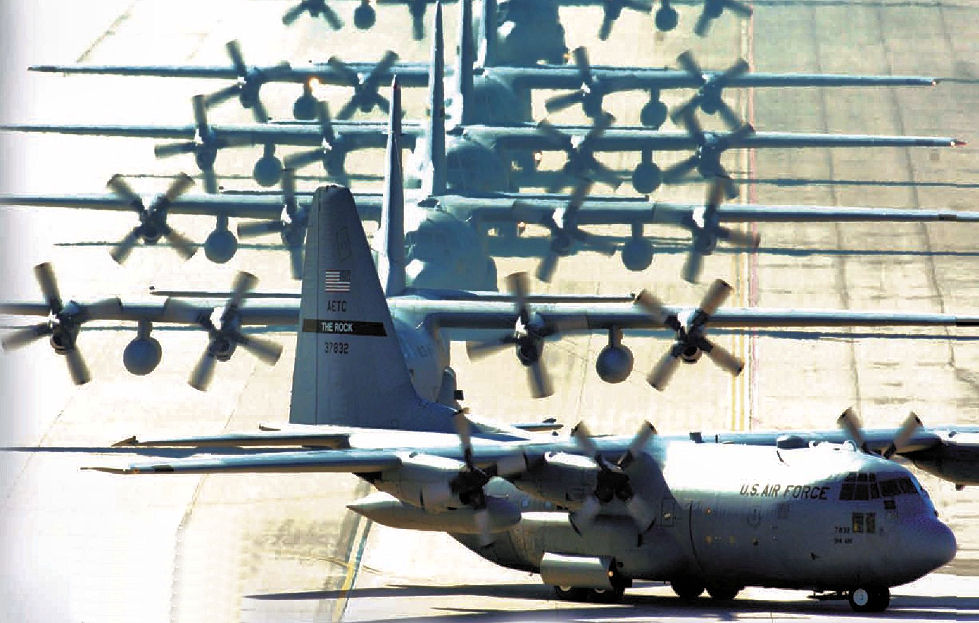
- 19th Airlift Wing C-130 Hercules aircraft at Little Rock AFB
- Active: 1948–1996; 2008–present
- Country: United States
- Branch: United States Air Force
- Role: Airlift
- Part of: Air Mobility Command
- Garrison/HQ: Little Rock Air Force Base, Arkansas
- Nickname: "Black Knights"
- Motto: In Alis Vincimus (Latin for 'On Wings We Conquer')
- Engagements: World War II; American Theater (1942–1944) -Asiatic-Pacific Campaign (1941–1942, 1944–1945): Korean Service (1950–1953); Grenada (1983); Southwest Asia (1990–1991)
- Decorations: Air Force Outstanding Unit Award; Republic of Korea Presidential Unit Citation

Commanders
- Current commander: Col. Bret Echard
- Vice commander: Col. Metodi V. Roulev
- Command Chief: CCM Melanie J. Grim

Insignia
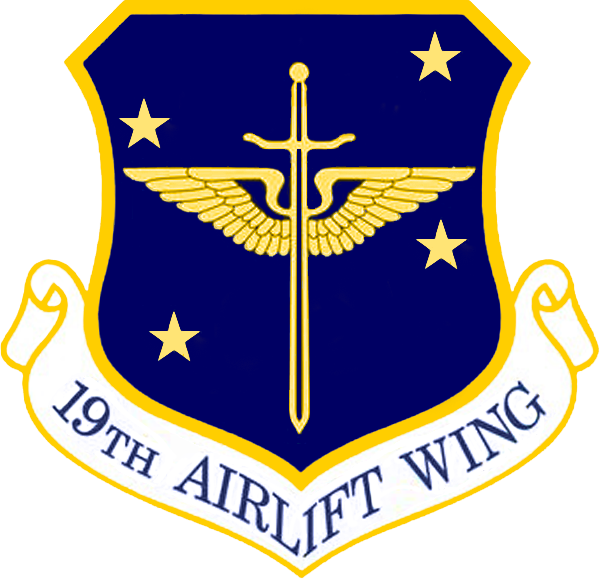
- 19th Airlift Wing emblem (Note: Approved 9 May 1952, modified 19 September 1983. The wing's emblem, first approved for the 19th Bombardment Group in slightly different form in 1936, shows a winged sword in front of the constellation of Pegasus, indicating both the striking force and navigation capability of the unit.)

The 19th Airlift Wing is a United States Air Force unit assigned to the Air Mobility Command's Eighteenth Air Force. It is stationed at Little Rock Air Force Base, Arkansas. The wing is also the host unit at Little Rock.

The Wing provides the Department of Defense its largest Lockheed C-130 Hercules transport fleet, supplying humanitarian airlift relief to victims of disasters, to airdropping supplies and troops into the heart of contingency operations in hostile areas.

Active for over 60 years, the 19th was part of Strategic Air Command's deterrent force during the Cold War. The wing served in the Korean War and Operation Desert Storm. It is currently engaged in combat operations.

The 19th Airlift Wing is commanded by Colonel Bret Echard. Its Command Chief Master Sergeant is Chief Master Sergeant Matthew A. Pease.

== Units ==
The 19th Airlift Wing is assigned the following units:

- 41st Airlift Squadron, C-130J
- 61st Airlift Squadron, C-130J
- 19th Operations Support Squadron
- 34th Combat Training Squadron
- 19th Aircraft Maintenance Squadron
- 19th Maintenance Squadron
- 19th Maintenance Operations Squadron
- 19th Mission Support Group

Encompasses the support and logistic functions for the base. The group includes contracting, civil engineer, communications, security forces, force support and the logistic readiness squadrons.

- 19th Medical Group

Provides responsive care and services to the base population and ensures a fit and medically ready active duty force.

19th Aeromedical Dental Squadron
19th Aerospace Medicine Squadron
19th Medical Operations Squadron

The 19th Airlift Wing staff includes a variety of agencies that directly support the wing commander, group commanders and the base population. It is organied along the A Staff model

== History ==
The 19th Bombardment Wing was formed in 1948 from resources of the former North Guam Air Force Base Command (Provisional). The 19th, with the 19th Bombardment Group as its operational flying unit, operated Andersen Air Force Base and maintained proficiency in Boeing B-29 Superfortresses. In May 1949, headquarters Twentieth Air Force moved from Guam to Kadena Air Base, Okinawa and its former staff was assigned to the 19th Bomb Wing.

At Andersen, the wing assumed responsibility for administering two active and one semi-active bases plus an assortment of communication, weather, radar, rescue and other facilities and units including the Marianas Air Materiel Area, a wing size unit. Many of the units and facilities were inactivated with a few months.

In October 1949, the 19th Wing again became subordinated to Twentieth Air Force and the remaining units in the Marianas and Bonin Islands were transferred to other organizations. From 17 October 1949 until 28 June 1950, the wing continued B-29 training, operation of Anderson and some rescue and reconnaissance missions.

=== Korean War ===
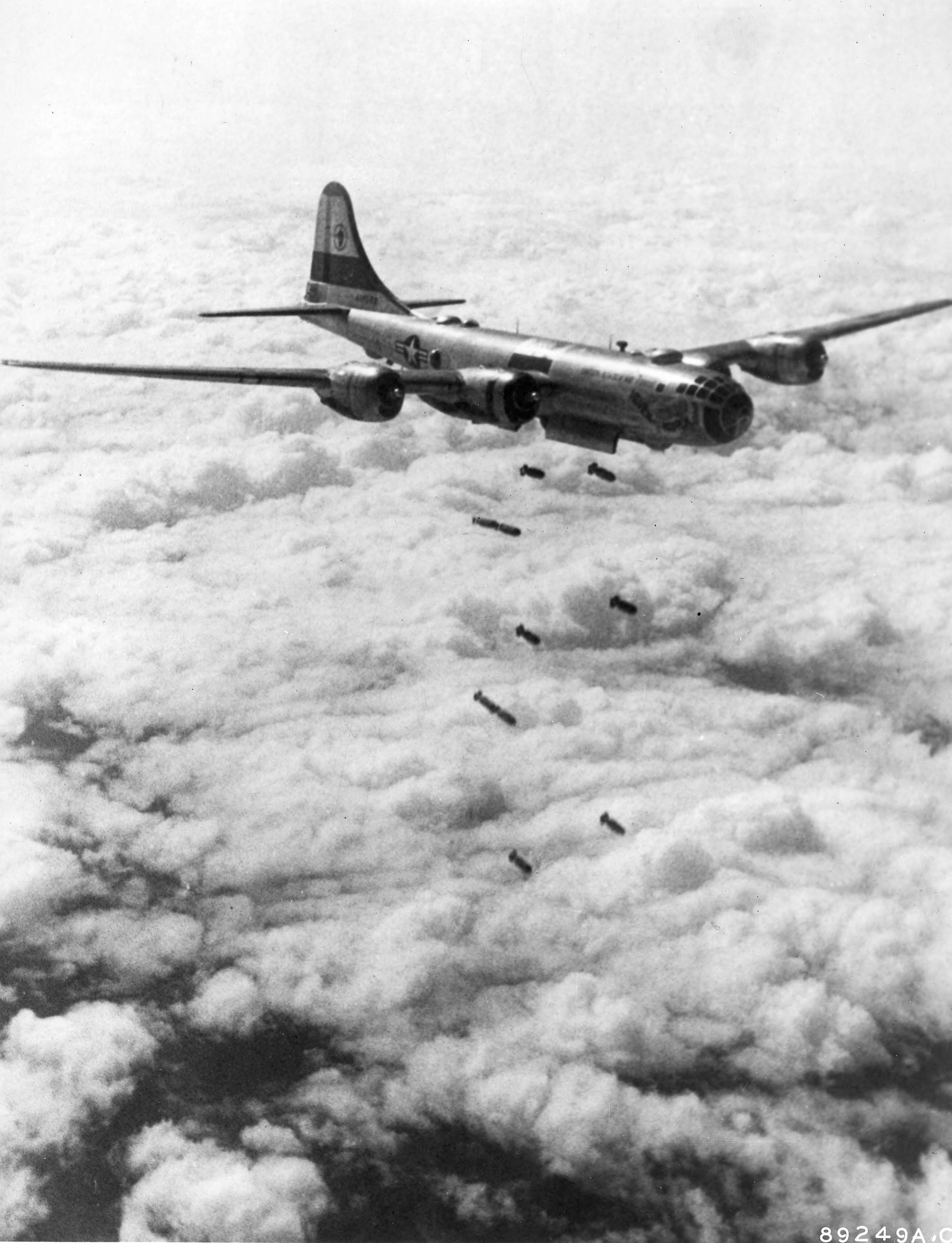
Wing B-29 dropping 1,000 lb bombs over Korea August 1951

When the Korean War broke out in late June 1950, the 19th Bombardment Group was immediately detached from the wing for combat operations from Kadena. From Kadena, the wing's operational squadrons (28th, 30th, 93d) attacked North Korean invasion forces. The first Superfortress unit in the war, the group on 28 June attacked North Korean storage tanks, marshalling yards, and armor. In the first two months, it flew more than six hundred sorties, supporting United Nations ground forces by bombing enemy troops, vehicles, and such communications points as the Han River bridges.

At Kadena, the group was initially under the operational control of Twentieth Air Force. After 8 July 1950, it was attached to Far East Air Forces Bomber Command (Provisional). Many of the aircraft flown by the 19th Bomb Group squadrons in combat were refurbished B-29s that were placed in storage after World War II, then brought back into operational service.

In the north, its targets included an oil refinery and port facilities at Wonsan, a railroad bridge at Pyongyang, and Yonpo Airfield. After United Nations ground forces pushed the communists out of South Korea, the 19th Group turned to strategic objectives in North Korea, including industrial and hydroelectric facilities. It also continued to attack bridges, marshalling yards, supply centers, artillery and troop positions, barracks, port facilities, and airfields.

In accordance with organizational change within the Strategic Air Command (SAC) and later throughout the entire Air Force, the 19th Bomb Group was inactivated on 1 June 1953 and its squadrons assigned directly to the 19th Bomb Wing, which moved its headquarters to Kadena.

=== Cold War ===
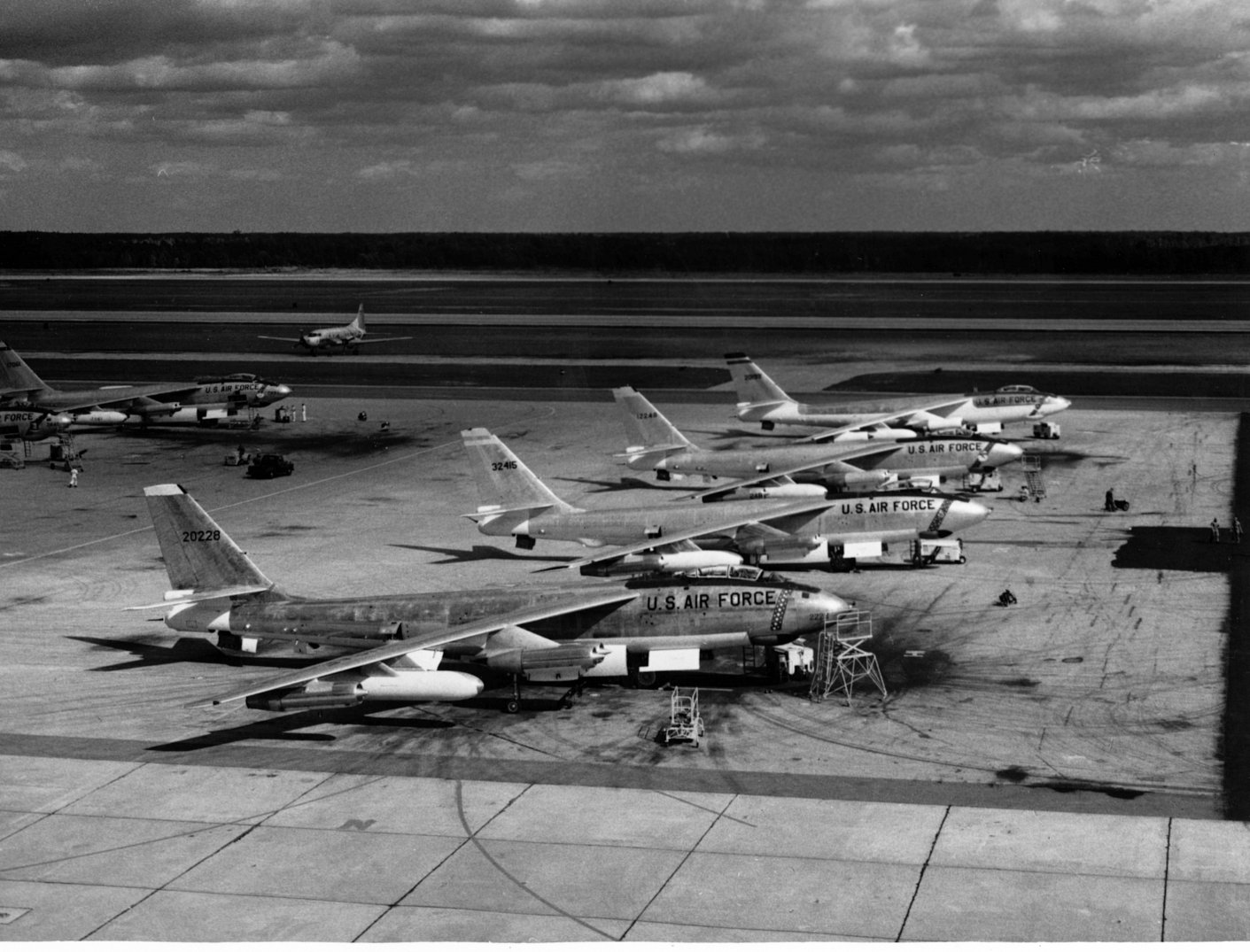
SAC B-47E Stratojets

In May 1954, the Wing was reassigned from Far East Air Forces to SAC and moved to Pinecastle Air Force Base, Florida, turning in its war-weary and obsolete B-29s at Davis-Monthan Air Force Base, Arizona, en route.

In 1954 the propeller-driven B-29s were replaced with new Boeing B-47E Stratojet swept-wing medium bombers capable of flying at high subsonic speeds and primarily designed for penetrating the airspace of the Soviet Union. They were assigned to the 28th, 30th, and 93rd Bombardment Squadrons.

The wing also gained an air refueling unit with the 100th Air Refueling Squadron which was attached to the wing from 2 February 1955 until 16 August 1956. In February 1956, the 19th Air Refueling Squadron was permanently assigned to the wing. Both units flew Boeing KC-97 Stratofreighters.

Early in 1955, the wing deployed to Sidi Slimane Air Base, French Morocco, January – April 1956, and to Ben Guerir Air Base, Morocco, May – July 1957. From July 1957 to April 1961, the wing maintained a portion of its tactical resources on overseas alert. Its B-47s were phased out of the SAC inventory beginning in 1960, sending the wing's last Stratojet to Davis-Monthan in 1961.

The 19th moved to Homestead Air Force Base, Florida on 1 June 1956 from Pinecastle. At Homestead, the wing consisted of one squadron in Florida (28th BS), and four squadrons:

- 30th Bombardment Squadron
- 93d Bombardment Squadron
- 525th Bombardment Squadron
- 526th Bombardment Squadron

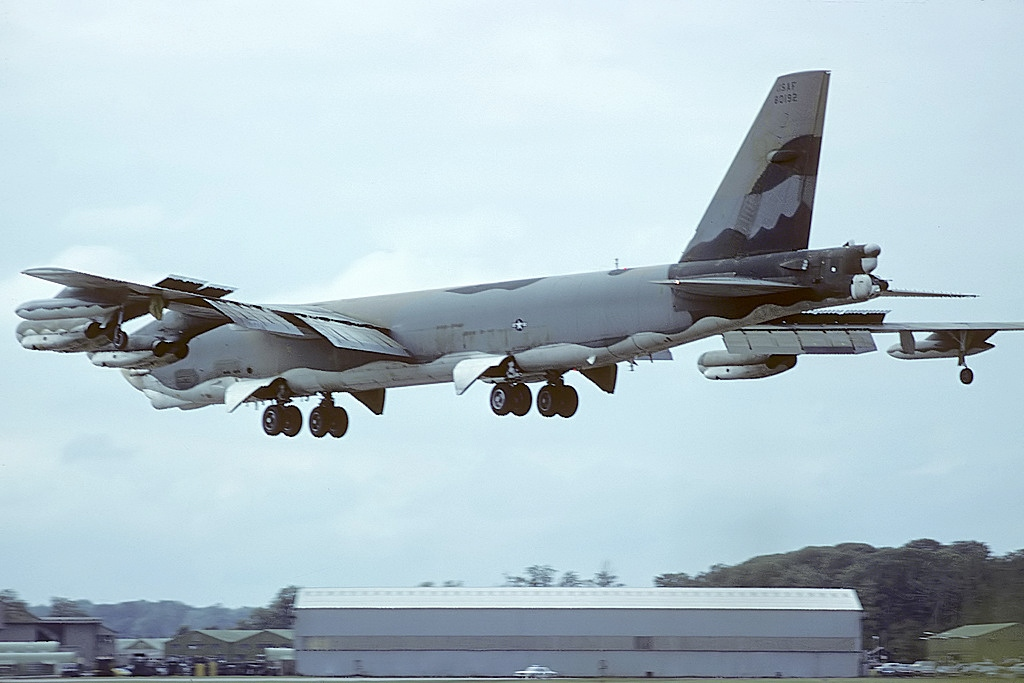
Wing Boeing B-52G at RAF Fairford

The wing converted to the Boeing B-52H Stratofortress and Boeing KC-135 Stratotanker aircraft in 1961–1962. However, most of its aircraft were reassigned. SAC was then in the process of establishing strategic wings and the 19th lost four squadrons to them. This left the 19th with one squadron of B-52Hs (28th BS).

On 7 June 1962, a wing B-52H broke the world record for distance flown on a closed course without landing or refueling. The mission was flown from Seymour Johnson Air Force Base, North Carolina. The flight covered 11,336.92 miles and broke a record set two years earlier by a B-52G of the 5th Bombardment Wing.

At Homestead, the wing won the Fairchild Trophy in the SAC bombing and navigation competition for 1966.

The 19th moved without personnel or equipment to Robins Air Force Base, Georgia in mid-1968, it absorbed resources of the 465th Bombardment Wing and converted to the B-52G. At Robins, the 19th furnished B–52 Operation Arc Light crews and KC–135 aircraft and crews supporting Yankee Team, Foreign Legion & Young Tiger Tanker Task Forces and crews to other SAC organizations. In the spring & summer of 1972, all assigned B-52Gs aircraft & crews deployed to the provisional strategic wing at Andersen Air Force Base and its KC-135A aircraft and crews deployed to the 376th Strategic Wing, at Kadena Air Base, Okinawa, involved in combat operations in Southeast Asia. In 1972, the wing deployed virtually all its aircraft and crews for combat operations, leaving headquarters at Robins minimally staffed. In November 1973, the wing returned from deployment and resumed normal operations. The 19th Bombardment Wing won the Omaha Trophy as the Outstanding Wing in SAC for 1981.

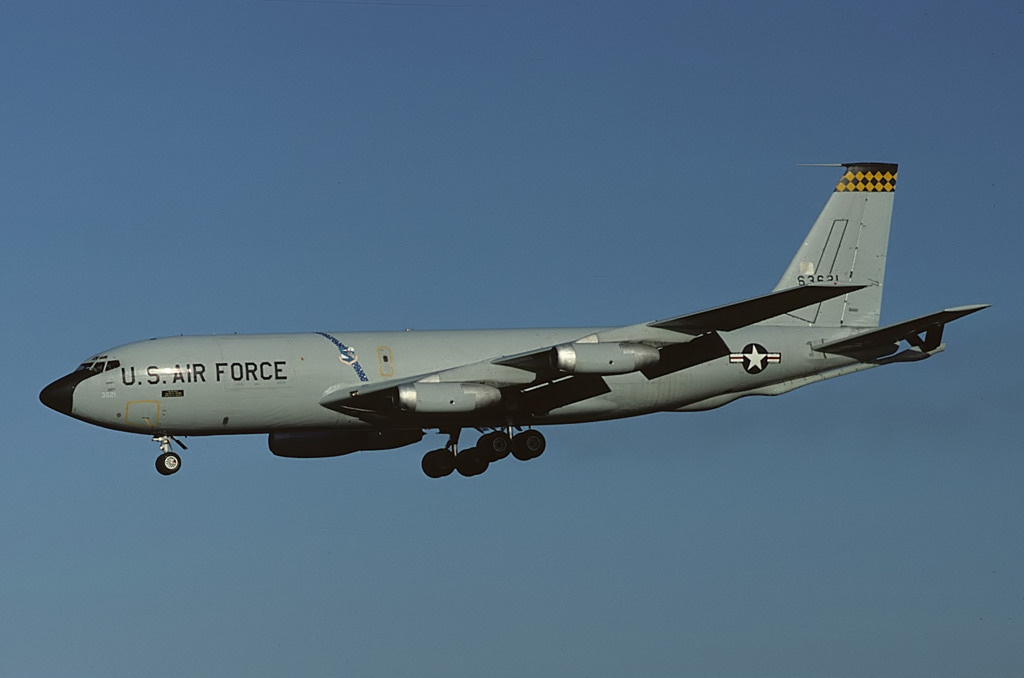
Wing KC-135A Stratotanker

The wing lost its B-52s and was redesignated as the 19th Air Refueling Wing on 1 October 1983. The wing undertook worldwide aerial refueling missions for various operations and exercises and supported the Eielson (Alaskan); Andersen (Pacific); & Spanish (European) Tanker Task Forces. It flew air refueling missions supporting Operation Urgent Fury, the overthrow of the Stalinist regime in Grenada 23 – 24 October 1983. Beginning in 1984, it provided two EC-135 aircraft and crews to support the United States Central Command in Southwest Asia.

With conversion to KC-135R aircraft, the wing continued supporting the Alaska and, Pacific Tanker Task Forces in 1988 and the Caribbean Tanker Task Force in March 1990. It flew air refueling missions for the Operation Just Cause, the overthrow of the regime of Manuel Noriega in Panama 18 – 21 December 1989 and deployed resources to Southwest Asia, August 1990 – March 1991, providing air refueling, cargo, and command, control and communications support.

It was redesignated the 19th Air Refueling Wing on 1 September 1991. The 19th Operations Group was activated at the same time as the flying component of the wing.

=== Post Cold War ===
From January 1992, it provided a Boeing EC-137 Stratoliner and crews to support the United States Special Operations Command, and from August 1992 the wing supported the Saudi Tanker Task Force. It provided air refueling support to NATO fighters in Bosnia in September – October 1995. Several KC-135R tankers deployed to Southwest Asia to support Operation Southern Watch, January – March 1996 and to Turkey for Operation Provide Comfort, April – June 1996.

On 1 July 1996, the 19th Air Refueling Wing was inactivated, and its functions turned over to its operations group, redesignated the 19th Air Refueling Group.

=== 19th Airlift Wing ===
The 19th was reactivated at Little Rock Air Force Base on 1 October 2008 as the 19th Airlift Wing. It is also the sponsor unit of Cadet Squadron 19 "Wolverines" at the United States Air Force Academy.

== Lineage ==
- Constituted as the 19th Bombardment Wing, Medium on 10 August 1948

Activated on 17 August 1948
Redesignated 19th Bombardment Wing, Heavy on 1 July 1961
Redesignated 19th Air Refueling Wing, Heavy on 1 October 1983
Redesignated 19th Air Refueling Wing on 1 September 1991
Inactivated on 1 July 1996

- Redesignated: 19th Airlift Wing on 18 September 2008

Activated on 1 October 2008

=== Assignments ===
- Twentieth Air Force, 17 August 1948
- Far East Air Forces, 16 May 1949
- Twentieth Air Force, 17 October 1949 (attached to Far East Air Forces Bomber Command, Provisional, 1 June 1953 – c. 28 May 1954)
- Second Air Force, 11 June 1954 (attached to 813th Air Division Provisional until 14 July 1954)
- 813th Air Division, 15 July 1954

Attached to 5th Air Division, 7 January-11 April 1956

- 823d Air Division, 1 June 1956 (attached to 5th Air Division, 8 May-7 July 1957)
- 57th Air Division, 25 July 1968
- 823d Air Division, 2 July 1969
- 42d Air Division, 30 June 1971
- Eighth Air Force, 16 June 1988
- Fifteenth Air Force, 1 September 1991
- Twenty-First Air Force, 1 July 1993 – 1 July 1996

Eighteenth Air Force (Air Forces Transportation), 1 October 2008 – present

=== Components ===
Groups

- 19th Bombardment Group (later 19th Operations Group): 17 August 1948 – 1 June 1953 (detached after 28 June 1950); 1 September 1991 – 1 July 1996, 1 October 2008 – c. 18 September 2025
- 457th Operations Group: 1 July 1993 – 1 October 1994

Squadrons

- 19th Air Refueling Squadron: 1 February 1956 – 1 April 1960 (detached 1 February – 30 June 1956)
- 19th Aircraft Maintenance Squadron, c. 18 September 2025 – present
- 19th Maintenance Squadron, c. 18 September 2025 – present
- 19th Operations Support Squadron, c. 18 September 2025 – present
- 21st Troop Carrier: attached 12 January – 1 February 1950
- 28th Bombardment Squadron: 1 June 1953 – 1 October 1983
- 30th Bombardment Squadron: 1 June 1953 – 1 January 1962
- 34th Combat Training Squadron, c. 18 September 2025 – present
- 41st Airlift Squadron, C-130J
- 52d Airlift Squadron, 3 October 2009 - 30 September 2015
- 53d Airlift Squadron, 15 May 2008 - 30 September 2016
- 61st Airlift Squadron, C-130J
- 93d Bombardment Squadron: 1 June 1953 – 1 August 1961
- 99th Air Refueling Squadron: 1 October 1983 – 1 September 1991
- 100th Air Refueling Squadron: attached 2 February 1955 – 16 August 1956
- 303d Air Refueling Squadron: 1 November 1959 – 1 April 1961
- 407th Air Refueling Squadron: 1 April 1962 – 2 July 1968
- 525th Bombardment Squadron: 9 January – 15 March 1961
- 526th Bombardment Squadron 9 January – June 1961
- 659th Bombardment Squadron: 1 November 1958 – 1 July 1961
- 912th Air Refueling Squadron: 25 July 1968 – 1 September 1991

=== Stations ===
- North Field (later North Guam Air Force Base; Andersen Air Force Base), Guam, 17 August 1948
- Kadena Air Base, Okinawa, 1 June 1953 – 28 May 1954
- Pinecastle Air Force Base, Florida, 11 June 1954
- Homestead Air Force Base, Florida, 1 June 1956
- Robins Air Force Base, Georgia, 25 July 1968 – 1 July 1996
- Little Rock Air Force Base, Arkansas, 1 October 2008 – present

=== Aircraft ===
- Boeing B-29 Superfortress, 1948–1954
- Boeing B-47 Stratojet, 1954–1961
- Boeing KC-97 Stratofreighter, 1955–1961
- Boeing B-52 Stratofortress, 1962–1972, 1973–1983
- Boeing KC-135 Stratotanker, 1962–1972, 1973–1996, 1996–2008
- Boeing EC-135, 1984–1996
- Boeing EC-137, 1991–1994
- Lockheed C-130 Hercules 2008 – present

== See also ==
- List of B-47 units of the United States Air Force
- List of B-52 Units of the United States Air Force
