= B-52 Memorial Park =

Park at the Orlando International Airport, Florida, US

Coordinates: 28°26′59″N 81°18′46″W

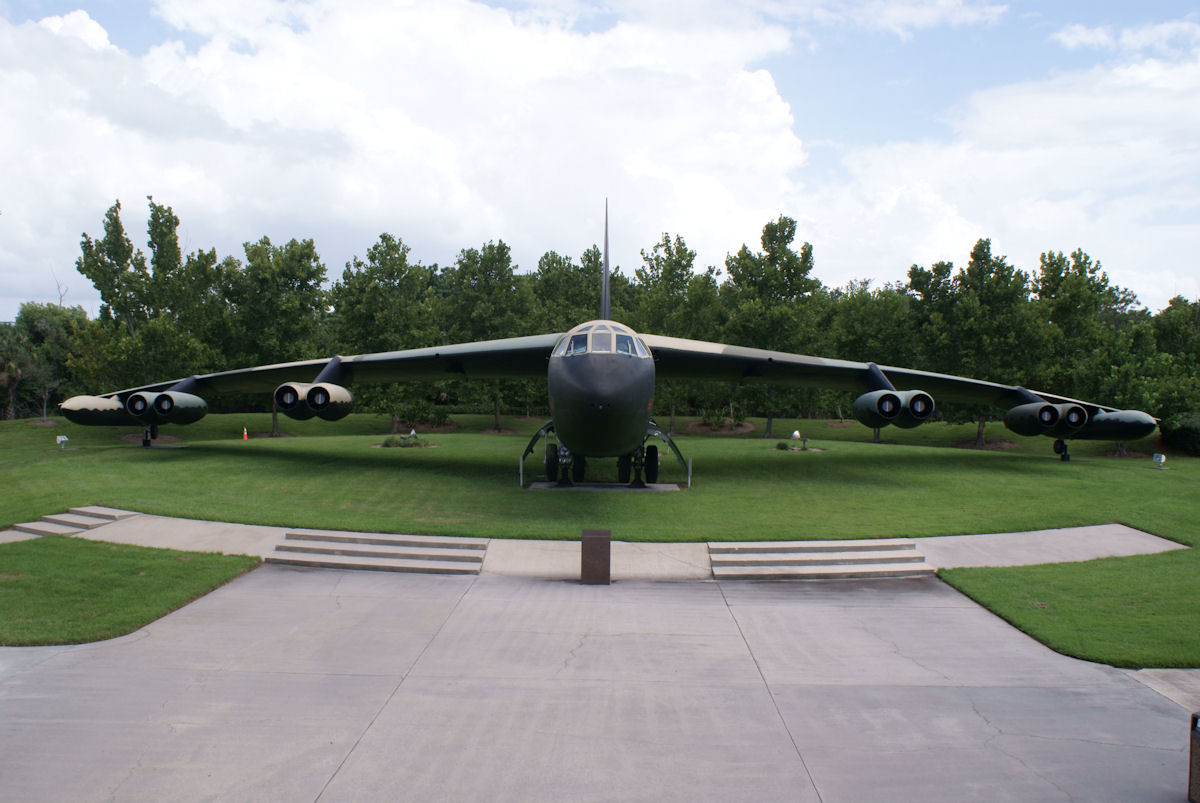
Frontal view of the B-52 at the Memorial Park.

B-52 Memorial Park is located within the Orlando International Airport just off the Beachline Expressway (formerly the Beeline Expressway) near runway 18L. It is a small, relatively hidden park under the control of the Greater Orlando Aviation Authority (GOAA) and features a retired B-52D Stratofortress, Air Force Serial Number 56-0687, from the Strategic Air Command. The aircraft was at one time assigned to the 306th Bomb Wing of the now defunct McCoy Air Force Base. The bomber was built in 1956 and retired 28 years later in 1984. Final flight was from its last unit of assignment, the 7th Bomb Wing at Carswell AFB in Fort Worth, Texas, to the former McCoy AFB, now Orlando International Airport, on February 20, 1984.

The park is located on Bear Road, accessible from Tradeport Drive just south of Beachline/SR 528 Exit 4, around the corner from where the old Orlando Jetport terminal, the predecessor to the current Orlando International Airport terminal, used to stand. The park is open from 7:00am to 6:00pm, and is free of charge to visit. The park contained a memorial for the Airport Authority's K-9s adjacent to the B-52, but is not present as of February 2026.
