= Fort Churchill =

Fort Churchill may refer to:

== Manitoba, Canada ==
- Fort Churchill, a former military installation that is now the Churchill Airport
- Churchill Rocket Research Range, a former rocket launch facility sometimes referred to as Fort Churchill
- Prince of Wales Fort, an 18th-century Hudson Bay Company fort also known as Fort Churchill

== Nevada, United States ==
- Fort Churchill, located in Fort Churchill State Historic Park
- Fort Churchill and Sand Springs Toll Road

== Others ==
- Fort Churchill (HBC vessel), motor sailing vessel operated by the HBC from 1913-1939 mainly in James Bay serving York Factory and Moose Factory, see Hudson's Bay Company vessels

== See also ==
- Churchill, Manitoba
