= 427th Air Refueling Squadron =

Inactive US Air Force unit

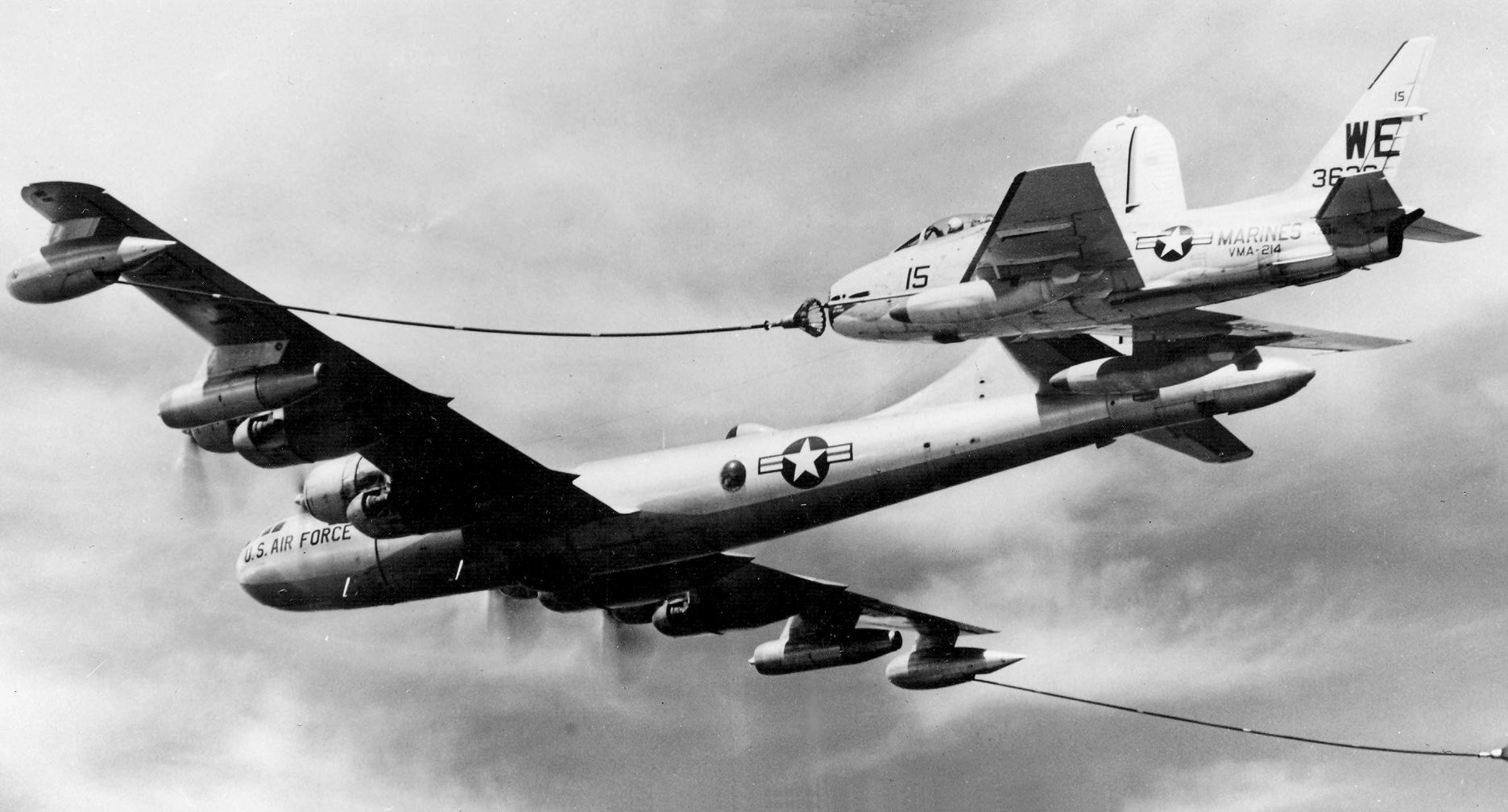
- Boeing KB-50 refueling a Marine FJ-4B
- Active: 1956–1963
- Country: United States
- Branch: United States Air Force
- Type: Aerial refueling

Insignia
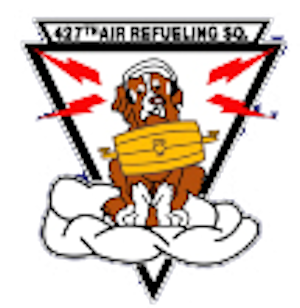
- 427th Air Refueling Squadron Emblem Approved 4 June 1957

The 427th Air Refueling Squadron is an inactive United States Air Force unit. It was last assigned to the 4505th Air Refueling Wing at Langley Air Force Base, Virginia, where it was inactivated on 1 April 1963.

== History ==
The squadron was established in 1956 by Tactical Air Command (TAC) to provide dedicated in-flight refueling, initially for F-100 Super Sabres, and later for other air refueling capable TAC fighters and fighter bombers. The 427th was initially equipped with Boeing KB-29M Superfortresses transferred from Strategic Air Command (SAC). These aircraft were converted from bombers to tankers using a British-developed hose refueling system.

The 427th retired its KB-29s by November 1957, and was fully equipped with Boeing KB-50 tankers by the end of the year. These were existing B-50A, B-50D or RB-50 aircraft with armament removed and equipped with a probe and drogue refueling system installed by Hayes Aircraft Corporation, and capable of refueling three fighters at the same time. The squadron began to send KB-50s to be modified to KB-50J configuration. These tankers added a General Electric J47 turbojet engine underneath each wing to increase the speed and altitude capability of the aircraft.

The unit's KB-50Js proved difficult to maintain to meet operational commitments, and modification of the aircraft to improve them would not be economical in view of their expected service life. Although TAC wanted to replace them with Boeing KC-135 Stratotankers, in 1960 the Air Force announced that Strategic Air Command (SAC) would become the Air Force's single manager for air refueling. TAC's KB-50s would be phased out by 1964, while SAC would acquire additional KC-135s to support TAC. In April 1963, the 429th inactivated, and its KB-50Js were sent to the Military Aircraft Storage and Disposition Center at Davis–Monthan Air Force Base, Arizona.

=== Accidents ===
- On 8 January 1962 a BKB-50 51-0465 was lost on a flight from Langley AFB, VA to Lajes AFB, Azores. About 1:00 pm a transmission was heard from the aircraft about 240 miles off the East coast. By 7:00 P.m. a search was started for the missing aircraft. An oil slick was found about 300 miles off the US Coast but it is unknown if that came from the missing aircraft

=== Lineage ===
- Constituted as 427th Air Refueling Squadron, Fighter-Bomber on 1 September 1956

Activated on 7 September 1956
Redesignated 427th Air Refueling Squadron, Tactical on 1 July 1958
Discontinued and inactivated on 1 April 1963

=== Assignments ===
- Ninth Air Force, 7 September 1956
- Eighteenth Air Force, 1 October 1957
- Twelfth Air Force, 1 January 1958
- 4505th Air Refueling Wing, 1 July 1958 – 1 April 1963 (not operational after 9 January 1963)

=== Stations ===
- Robins AFB, Georgia, 7 September 1956
- Langley AFB, Virginia, 20 August 1958 – 1 April 1963

=== Aircraft ===
- KB-29M Superfortress, 1956–1959
- KB-50/KB-50J Superfortress, 1959–1963
